Austria-Hungary, often referred to as the Austro-Hungarian Empire, the Dual Monarchy, or Austria, was a constitutional monarchy and great power in Central Europe between 1867 and 1918. It was formed with the Austro-Hungarian Compromise of 1867 in the aftermath of the Austro-Prussian War and was dissolved shortly after its defeat in the First World War.

Austria-Hungary was ruled by the House of Habsburg and constituted the last phase in the constitutional evolution of the Habsburg monarchy. It was a multinational state and one of Europe's major powers at the time. The Empire built up the fourth-largest machine building industry in the world, after the United States, Germany and the United Kingdom. Austria-Hungary also became the world's third-largest manufacturer and exporter of electric home appliances, electric industrial appliances, and power generation apparatus for power plants, after the United States and the German Empire.

At its core was the dual monarchy which was a real union between Cisleithania, the northern and western parts of the former Austrian Empire, and the Kingdom of Hungary. Following the 1867 reforms, the Austrian and Hungarian states were co-equal in power. The two states conducted common foreign, defense, and financial policies, but all other governmental faculties were divided among respective states. A third component of the union was the Kingdom of Croatia-Slavonia, an autonomous region under the Hungarian crown, which negotiated the Croatian–Hungarian Settlement in 1868. After 1878, Bosnia and Herzegovina came under Austro-Hungarian joint military and civilian rule until it was fully annexed in 1908, provoking the Bosnian crisis among the other powers.

Austria-Hungary was one of the Central Powers in World War I, which began with an Austro-Hungarian war declaration on the Kingdom of Serbia on 28 July 1914. It was already effectively dissolved by the time the military authorities signed the armistice of Villa Giusti on 3 November 1918. The Kingdom of Hungary and the First Austrian Republic were treated as its successors de jure, whereas the independence of the West Slavs and South Slavs of the Empire as the First Czechoslovak Republic, the Second Polish Republic, and the Kingdom of Yugoslavia, respectively, and most of the territorial demands of the Kingdom of Romania and the Kingdom of Italy were also recognized by the victorious powers in 1920.

Formation

The Austro-Hungarian Compromise of 1867 (called the Ausgleich in German and the Kiegyezés in Hungarian), which inaugurated the empire's dual structure in place of the former Austrian Empire (1804–1867), originated at a time when Austria had declined in strength and in power—both in the Italian Peninsula (as a result of the Second Italian War of Independence of 1859) and among the states of the former German Confederation, replaced following the Austro-Prussian War of 1866 with the North German Confederation under the leadership of Prussia as the dominant German-speaking power, leaving meanwhile the Austrian Empire outside. The Compromise re-established the full sovereignty of the Kingdom of Hungary, which had been lost after the Hungarian Revolution of 1848.

Other factors in the constitutional changes were continued Hungarian dissatisfaction with rule from Vienna and increasing national consciousness on the part of other nationalities (or ethnicities) of the Austrian Empire. Hungarian dissatisfaction arose partly from Austria's suppression, with Russian support, of the Hungarian liberal revolution of 1848–49. However, dissatisfaction with Austrian rule had grown for many years within Hungary and had many other causes.

By the late 1850s, a large number of Hungarians who had supported the 1848–49 revolution were willing to accept the Habsburg monarchy. They argued that, while Hungary had the right to full internal independence, under the Pragmatic Sanction of 1713, foreign affairs and defense were "common" to both Austria and Hungary.

After the Austrian defeat at Königgrätz, the government realized it needed to reconcile with Hungary to regain the status of a great power. The new foreign minister, Count Friedrich Ferdinand von Beust, wanted to conclude the stalemated negotiations with the Hungarians. To secure the monarchy, Emperor Franz Joseph began negotiations for a compromise with the Hungarian nobility, led by Ferenc Deák. On 20 March 1867, the re-established Hungarian parliament at Pest started to negotiate the new laws to be accepted on 30 March. However, Hungarian leaders received the Emperor's coronation as King of Hungary on 8 June as a necessity for the laws to be enacted within the lands of the Holy Crown of Hungary. On 28 July, Franz Joseph, in his new capacity as King of Hungary, approved and promulgated the new laws, which officially gave birth to the Dual Monarchy.

Name and terminology

The Austrians also used the names  (in detail) and Danubian Monarchy or Dual Monarchy and The Double Eagle, but none of these became widespread either in Hungary or elsewhere.

The realm's full name used in the internal administration was The Kingdoms and Lands Represented in the Imperial Council and the Lands of the Holy Hungarian Crown of St. Stephen.
 German: 
 Hungarian: 

From 1867 onwards, the abbreviations heading the names of official institutions in Austria–Hungary reflected their responsibility:
  or Imperial-Royal was the term for institutions of Cisleithania (Austria); "royal" in this label referred to the Crown of Bohemia.
In the Kingdom of Croatia and Slavonia, its autonomous institutions hold k. ("Royal") as according to the Croatian–Hungarian Settlement, the only official language in Croatia and Slavonia was Croatian, and those institutions were "only" Croatian.

Following a decision of Franz Joseph I in 1868, the realm bore the official name Austro-Hungarian Monarchy/Realm in its international relations. It was often contracted to the Dual Monarchy in English or simply referred to as Austria.

Politics

Overview
The Compromise turned the Habsburg domains into a real union between the Austrian Empire ("Lands Represented in the Imperial Council", or Cisleithania) in the western and northern half and the Kingdom of Hungary ("Lands of the Crown of Saint Stephen", or Transleithania). in the eastern half. The two halves shared a common monarch, who ruled as Emperor of Austria over the western and northern half portion and as King of Hungary over the eastern portion. Foreign relations and defense were managed jointly, and the two countries also formed a customs union. All other state functions were to be handled separately by each of the two states.

Certain regions, such as Polish Galicia within Cisleithania and Croatia within Transleithania, enjoyed autonomous status, each with its own unique governmental structures (see: Polish Autonomy in Galicia and Croatian–Hungarian Settlement).

The division between Austria and Hungary was so marked that there was no common citizenship: one was either an Austrian citizen or a Hungarian citizen, never both. This also meant that there were always separate Austrian and Hungarian passports, never a common one. However, neither Austrian nor Hungarian passports were used in the Kingdom of Croatia-Slavonia. Instead, the Kingdom issued its own passports, which were written in Croatian and French, and displayed the coat of arms of the Kingdom of Croatia-Slavonia-Dalmatia on them. Croatia-Slavonia also had executive autonomy regarding naturalization and citizenship, defined as "Hungarian-Croatian citizenship" for the kingdom's citizens. It is not known what kind of passports were used in Bosnia-Herzegovina, which was under the control of both Austria and Hungary.

The Kingdom of Hungary had always maintained a separate parliament, the Diet of Hungary, even after the Austrian Empire was created in 1804. The administration and government of the Kingdom of Hungary (until 1848–49 Hungarian revolution) remained largely untouched by the government structure of the overarching Austrian Empire. Hungary's central government structures remained well separated from the Austrian imperial government. The country was governed by the Council of Lieutenancy of Hungary (the Gubernium) – located in Pressburg and later in Pest – and by the Hungarian Royal Court Chancellery in Vienna. The Hungarian government and Hungarian parliament were suspended after the Hungarian revolution of 1848 and were reinstated after the Austro-Hungarian Compromise in 1867.

Vienna served as the Monarchy's primary capital. The Cisleithanian (Austrian) part contained about 57 percent of the total population and the larger share of its economic resources, compared to the Hungarian part.

There were three parts to the rule of the Austro-Hungarian Empire:

 the common foreign, military, and a joint financial policy (only for diplomatic, military, and naval expenditures; later also included the Bosnian affairs) under the monarch
 the "Austrian" or Cisleithanian government (Lands Represented in the Imperial Council)
 the "Hungarian" or Transleithanian government (Lands of the Crown of Saint Stephen)

The first prime minister of Hungary after the Compromise was Count Gyula Andrássy (1867–1871). The old Hungarian Constitution was restored, and Franz Joseph was crowned as King of Hungary. Andrássy next served as the Foreign Minister of Austria–Hungary (1871–1879).

The Empire relied increasingly on a cosmopolitan bureaucracy—in which Czechs played an important role—backed by loyal elements, including a large part of the German, Hungarian, Polish and Croat aristocracy.

After 1878, Bosnia and Herzegovina came under Austro-Hungarian military and civilian rule until it was fully annexed in 1908, provoking the Bosnian crisis among the other powers. The northern part of the Ottoman Sanjak of Novi Pazar was also under de facto joint occupation during that period, but the Austro-Hungarian army withdrew as part of their annexation of Bosnia. The annexation of Bosnia also led to Islam being recognized as an official state religion due to Bosnia's Muslim population.

Joint government 
The common government (officially designated Ministerial Council for Common Affairs, or Ministerrat für gemeinsame Angelegenheiten in German) came into existence in 1867 as a result of the Austro-Hungarian Compromise. The Government of Austria, which ruled the monarchy until then became the government of the Austrian part and another government was formed for the Hungarian part. A common government was also formed for the few matters of common national security - the Common Army, navy, foreign policy and the imperial household, and the customs union. It consisted of three Imperial and Royal Joint-ministries:
Ministry of the Imperial and Royal Household and Foreign Affairs, known as the Imperial Chancellery before 1869; 
Imperial and Royal Ministry of War, known as the Imperial Ministry of War before 1911;
Imperial and Royal Ministry of Finance, known as the Imperial Ministry of Finance before 1908, responsible only for the finances of the other two joint-ministries. 
The Minister of the Imperial and Royal Household and Foreign Affairs was the chairman (except when the Monarch was present and led the meetings himself) and thus he was de facto the common prime minister. Since 1869 the prime ministers of the Austrian and Hungarian halves of the monarchy were also members of the common government. The Chief of the General Staff usually attended the meetings (with no voting rights) as he had the intelligence service (the Evidenzbureau) under his subordination. When required ministers and high-ranking officials from the Austrian and the Hungarian governments could also attend the meetings, but also without voting rights. In addition to the council, the Austrian and Hungarian parliaments each elected a delegation of 60 members, who met separately and voted on the expenditures of the Ministerial Council, giving the two governments influence in the common administration. However, the ministers ultimately answered only to the monarch, who had the final decision on matters of foreign and military policy.

Overlapping responsibilities between the joint ministries and the ministries of the two halves caused friction and inefficiencies. The armed forces suffered particularly from the overlap. Although the unified government determined the overall military direction, the Austrian and Hungarian governments each remained in charge of recruiting, supplies and training. Each government could have a strong influence over common governmental responsibilities. Each half of the Dual Monarchy proved quite prepared to disrupt common operations to advance its own interests.

Relations during the half-century after 1867 between the two parts of the dual monarchy featured repeated disputes over shared external tariff arrangements and over the financial contribution of each government to the common treasury. These matters were determined by the Austro-Hungarian Compromise of 1867, in which common expenditures were allocated 70% to Austria and 30% to Hungary. This division had to be renegotiated every ten years. There was political turmoil during the build-up to each renewal of the agreement. By 1907, the Hungarian share had risen to 36.4%. The disputes culminated in the early 1900s in a prolonged constitutional crisis. It was triggered by disagreement over which language to use for command in Hungarian army units and deepened by the advent to power in Budapest in April 1906 of a Hungarian nationalist coalition. Provisional renewals of the common arrangements occurred in October 1907 and in November 1917 on the basis of the status quo. The negotiations in 1917 ended with the dissolution of the Dual Monarchy.

In 1878, the Congress of Berlin placed the Bosnia Vilayet of the Ottoman Empire under Austro-Hungarian occupation. The region was formally annexed in 1908 and was governed by Austria and Hungary jointly (a Condominium). The governor-general of Bosnia and Herzegovina was always an army officer, but he was first and foremost the head of the civil administration in the province (the Bosnian Office) and was subordinated to the common Ministry of Finance (as the common government lacked a ministry of the interior). Bosnia received a Territorial Statute (Landesstatut) with the setting up of a Territorial Diet, regulations for the election and procedure of the Diet, a law of associations, a law of public meetings, and a law dealing with the district councils. According to this statute Bosnia-Herzegovina formed a single administrative territory under the responsible direction and supervision of the Ministry of Finance of the Dual Monarchy in Vienna.

Parliaments

Hungary and Austria maintained separate parliaments, each with its own prime minister: the Diet of Hungary (commonly known as the National Assembly) and the Imperial Council in Cisleithania. Each parliament had its own executive government, appointed by the monarch. In this sense, Austria–Hungary remained under an autocratic government, as the Emperor-King appointed both Austrian and Hungarian prime ministers along with their respective cabinets. This made both governments responsible to the Emperor-King, as neither half could have a government with a program contrary to the views of the Monarch. The Emperor-King could appoint non-parliamentary governments, for example, or keep a government that did not have a parliamentary majority in power in order to block the formation of another government which he did not approve of.

Cisleithania
The Imperial Council was a bicameral body: the upper house was the House of Lords, and the lower house was the House of Deputies. Members of the House of Deputies were elected through a system of "curiae" which weighted representation in favor of the wealthy but was progressively reformed until universal male suffrage was introduced in 1906. To become law, bills had to be passed by both houses, signed by the government minister responsible and then granted royal assent by the Emperor.

Transleithania
The Diet of Hungary was also bicameral: the upper house was the House of Magnates, and the lower house was the House of Representatives. The "curia" system was also used to elect members of the House of Representatives. Franchise was very limited, with around 5% of men eligible to vote in 1874, rising to 8% at the beginning of World War I. The Hungarian parliament had the power to legislate on all matters concerning Hungary, but for Croatia-Slavonia only on matters which it shared with Hungary. Matters concerning Croatia-Slavonia alone fell to the Croatian-Slavonian Diet (commonly referred to as the Croatian Parliament). The Monarch had the right to veto any kind of Bill before it was presented to the National Assembly, the right to veto all legislation passed by the National Assembly, and the power to prorogue or dissolve the Assembly and call for new elections. In practice, these powers were rarely used.

Bosnia and Herzegovina condominium
The Diet (Sabor) of Bosnia-Herzegovina was created in 1910. Its setup consisted of a single Chamber, elected on the principle of the representation of interests. It numbered 92 members. Of these 20 consisted of representatives of all the religious confessions, the president of the Supreme Court, the president of the Chamber of Advocates, the president of the Chamber of Commerce, and the mayor of Sarajevo. In addition to these were 72 deputies, elected by three curiae or electoral groups. The first curia included the large landowners, the highest taxpayers, and people who had reached a certain standard of education without regard to the amount they paid in taxes. To the second curia belonged inhabitants of the towns not qualified to vote in the first; to the third, country dwellers disqualified in the same way. With this curial system was combined the grouping of the mandates and of the electors according to the three dominant creeds (Catholic, Serbian Orthodox, Muslim). To the adherents of other creeds the right was conceded of voting with one or other of the religious electoral bodies within the curia to which they belonged.

The Diet had very limited legislative powers. The main legislative power was in the hands of the emperor, the parliaments in Vienna and Budapest, and the joint-minister of finance. The Diet of Bosnia could make proposals, but they had to be approved by both parliaments in Vienna and Budapest. The Diet could only deliberate on matters that affected Bosnia and Herzegovina exclusively; decisions on armed forces, commercial and traffic connections, customs, and similar matters, were made by the parliaments in Vienna and Budapest. The Diet also had no control over the National Council or the municipal councils.

Government of Cisleithania 
The Emperor of the dual monarchy in his right of Emperor of Austria and King of Bohemia, ruler of the Austrian part of the realm, officially named The Kingdoms and Lands Represented in the Parliament of the Realm (Die im Reichsrate vertretenen Königreiche und Länder), simplified in 1915 to just Austrian Lands (Österreichische Länder) appointed the Government of Austria. The Austrian ministries carried the designation Imperial-Royal Ministry (sing. k.k. Ministerium), in which Imperial stands for the Kaiser's title of Emperor and Austria and Royal stands for his title of King of Bohemia. The central authorities were known as the "Ministry" (Ministerium). In 1867 the Ministerium consisted of seven ministries (Agriculture, Religion and Education, Finance, Interior, Justice, Commerce and Public Works, Defence). A Ministry of Railways was created in 1896, and the Ministry of Public Works was separated from Commerce in 1908. ("Imperial-Royal"), referring to the Imperial Crown of Austria and the Royal Crown of Bohemia.

The Government included:
 the Imperial-Royal Prime Minister (k.k. Ministerpräsident);
 the Imperial-Royal Ministry of Agriculture (k.k. Ministerium für Ackerbau);
 the Imperial-Royal Ministry of Worship and Education (k.k. Ministerium für Cultus und Unterricht);
 the Imperial-Royal Ministry of the Railways (k.k. Ministerium für Eisenbahn), formed in 1896;
 the Imperial-Royal Ministry of Finance (k.k. Ministerium für Finanzen);
 the Imperial-Royal Ministry of Commerce (k.k. Ministerium für Handel);
 the Imperial-Royal Ministry of Interior Affairs (k.k. Ministerium des Inneres);
 the Imperial-Royal Ministry of Justice (k.k. Ministerium der Justiz);
 the Imperial-Royal Ministry of Territorial Defence (k.k. Ministerium für Landesverteidigung);
 the Imperial-Royal Ministry of Public Works [Expenditure] (k.k. Ministerium für öffentliche Arbeiten), formed in 1908;
 the Imperial-Royal Ministry of Social Care (k.k. Ministerium für Soziale Fürsorge), formed in 1917; and
 the Imperial-Royal Ministry of People's Healthcare (k.k. Ministerium für Volksgesundheit), also formed in 1917.

Local administration and governments of Cisleithania

The administrative system in the Austrian Empire consisted of three levels: the central State administration, the territories (Länder), and the local communal administration. The State administration comprised all affairs having relation to rights, duties, and interests "which are common to all territories"; all other administrative tasks were left to the territories. Finally, the communes had self-government within their own sphere.

Regional autonomy 

Each of the seventeen territories of Cisleithania had an official from the central government, informally called a territorial chief (Landeschef). He was appointed by the Emperor at the advise of the Austrian Prime Minister and had his own small administrative office. The chief played a dual role in his assigned territory - a viceroy on behalf of the Emperor and governor on behalf of the Austrian central government. He was thus under the dual supervision of the monarch and the prime minister, appointed by the former at the advise of the latter and could be dismissed in the same manner or at the Emperor's own discretion. In five crown lands - the duchies of Salzburg, Carinthia, Carniola, Upper and Lower Silesia (commonly known as Austrian SIlesia) and Bukovina the territorial chief was called a Provincial President (Landespräsident) and his administrative office was called a Provincial Government (Landesregierung). The other twelve entities within the Austrian half of the Monarchy (the Princely County of Gorizia, the Margraviate of Istria and the Free Imperial City of Trieste were combined for administrative purposes into a crown land called the Coastal Land(s) or Küstenland, the three provincial parliaments were kept separated) had an Imperial–royal Stateholder (K.k. Statthalter) with an administrative office called an Office of the Stateholder or Stateholder's Chancellery (Statthalterei) Although the official designations were different, the institutions had exactly the same functions. Stateholders were appointed for the Kingdom of Bohemia, the Kingdom of Galicia and Lodomeria, the Archduchy of Austria down the River Enns, the Archduchy of Austria up the River Enns, the Duchy of Styria, the Margraviate of Moravia, the Princely Country of Tyrol (jointly administrated with the Province of Vorarlberg) and the joint Coastal Land.

Each entity had its own provincial parliament, called a Landtag, elected by the voters (some princely nobles were unelected members in their own right). The Emperor appointed one of its members as Landeshauptmann (i.e., provincial premier). The Landeshauptmann was the Speaker of the Landtag and thus a member of the provincial legislature. As the Landtag usually held ceremonial sessions once a year, the body elected its own Standing Conference, which both carried the legislative functions of the provincial parliament (when not in session) and a collective government for the departments of the provincial administration. In this role the Landeshauptmann and the Landesausschuss also belonged to the provincial executive and are the precursors of the modern provincial governments of the States of Austria. Many branches of the territorial administrations had great similarities with those of the State, so that their spheres of activity frequently overlapped and came into collision. This administrative "double track", as it was called, resulted largely from the origin of the State – for the most part through a voluntary union of countries that had a strong sense of their own individuality.

Local government 
Below the territory was the district (Bezirk) under a district-head (Bezirkshauptmann), appointed by the State government. These district-heads united nearly all the administrative functions which were divided among the various ministries. Each district was divided into a number of municipalities (Ortsgemeinden), each with its own elected mayor (Bürgermeister). The nine statutory cities were autonomous units at the district-level.

The complexity of this system, particularly the overlap between State and territorial administration, led to moves for administrative reform. As early as 1904, premier Ernest von Koerber had declared that a complete change in the principles of administration would be essential if the machinery of State were to continue working. Richard von Bienerth's last act as Austrian premier in May 1911 was the appointment of a commission nominated by the Emperor to draw up a scheme of administrative reform. The imperial rescript did not present reforms as a matter of urgency or outline an overall philosophy for them. The continuous progress of society, it said, had made increased demands on the administration, that is to say, it was assumed that reform was required because of the changing times, not underlying problems with the administrative structure. The reform commission first occupied itself with reforms about which there was no controversy. In 1912 it published "Proposals for the training of State officials". The commission produced several further reports before its work was interrupted by the outbreak of World War I in 1914. It was not until March 1918 that the Seidler Government decided upon a program of national autonomy as a basis for administrative reform, which was, however, never carried into effect.

Government of Transleithania

The Emperor of the dual monarchy in his right of Apostolic King of Hungary and King of Croatia and Slavonia, ruler of the Hungarian part of the realm, officially named The Lands of the Holy Hungarian Crown (A Magyar Szent Korona országai) appointed the Government of Hungary. The Hungarian ministries carried the designation the Kingdom of Hungary's ... Ministry (sing. Magyar Királyi ...minisztérium), in which Royal stands for the Kaiser's title of Apostolic King of Hungary. Executive power in Transleithania was vested in a cabinet responsible to the National Assembly, consisting of ten ministers, including: the Prime Minister, the Minister for Croatia-Slavonia, a Minister besides the King, and the Ministers of the Interior, National Defence, Religion and Public Education, Finance, Agriculture, Industry, and Trade, Public Works and Transport, and Justice. The Minister besides the King was responsible for coordination with Austria and the Imperial and royal court in Vienna. In 1889, the Ministry of Agriculture, Industry, and Trade was split into separate ministries of Agriculture and Trade. The Ministry of Public Works and Transport was folded into the new Ministry of Trade.

The Government included:
 the Kingdom of Hungary's Prime Minister (Magyar Királyság miniszterelnök)
 the Kingdom of Hungary's Ministry of Agriculture (Magyar Királyság Földművelésügyi Minisztérium), at times united with the Ministry of Industry and Commerce;
 the Kingdom of Hungary's Ministry of Finance (Magyar Királyság Pénzügyminiszterium);
 the Kingdom of Hungary's Ministry of Commerce (Magyar Királyság kereskedelemügyi Miniszterium);
 the Kingdom of Hungary's Ministry of Justice (Magyar Királyság Igazságügy Miniszterium);
 the Kingdom of Hungary's Ministry of Territorial Defence (Magyar Királyság Honvédelmi Miniszterium);
 the Kingdom of Hungary's Ministry of Worship and Public Education Defence (Magyar Királyság Vallás- és Közoktatásügyi Miniszterium);
 the Ministry at the High Court of His Majesty the King (A Király Személye Körüli Minisztérium), the liaison office in Vienna between the Emperor in his right of Apostolic King of Hungary and the Hungarian government and the
 Minister without Portfollio of Croatian, Slavonian and Dalmatian Affairs (Hungarian: Horvát-Szlavón-Dalmát Tárca Nélküli Miniszter or Croatian: Hrvatsko-slavonsko-dalmatinski Ministar bez Lisnice). As the Kingdom of Hungary was in personal union with the Kingdoms of Croatia and Slavonia, there was a minister at the Government of Hungary responsible for the limited autonomy of those regions.

From 1867 the administrative and political divisions of the lands belonging to the Hungarian crown were remodeled due to some restorations and other changes. In 1868 Transylvania was definitely reunited to Hungary proper, and the town and district of Fiume maintained its status as a Corpus separatum ("separate body"). The "Military Frontier" was abolished in stages between 1871 and 1881, with Banat and Šajkaška being incorporated into Hungary proper and the Croatian and Slavonian Military Frontiers joining Croatia-Slavonia.

Autonomous Government of Croatia-Slavonia 

The Autonomous Government, officially Royal Croatian–Slavonian–Dalmatian Land Government ( or Kraljevska hrvatsko–slavonsko–dalmatinska zemaljska vlada) was established in 1869 with its seat in Zagreb. The Autonomous Government included:
 the Ban (Hrvatski ban) - the head of the Autonomous Government;
 the Department of Internal Affairs (Odjel za unutarnje poslove);
 the Department of Religion and Education (Odjel za bogoštovlje i nastavu);
 the Department of Justice (Odjel za pravosuđe);
 the Department of National Economy (Odjel za narodno gospodarstvo) (from 1914).

Local administration and governments of Transleithania
In regard to local government, Hungary had traditionally been divided into around seventy counties (singular megye;) and an array of districts and cities with special statuses. This system was reformed in two stages. In 1870, most historical privileges of territorial subdivisions were abolished, but the existing names and territories were retained. At this point, there were a total of 175 territorial subdivisions: 65 counties (49 in Hungary proper, 8 in Transylvania, and 8 in Croatia), 89 cities with municipal rights, and 21 other types of municipality (3 in Hungary proper and 18 in Transylvania). In a further reform in 1876, most of the cities and other types of municipality were incorporated into the counties. The counties in Hungary were grouped into seven circuits, which had no administrative function. The lowest level subdivision was the district or processus.

After 1876, some urban municipalities remained independent of the counties in which they were situated. There were 26 of these urban municipalities in Hungary: Arad, Baja, Debreczen, Győr, Hódmezővásárhely, Kassa, Kecskemét, Kolozsvár, Komárom, Marosvásárhely, Nagyvárad, Pancsova, Pécs, Pozsony, Selmecz- és Bélabanya, Sopron, Szabadka, Szatmárnémeti, Szeged, Székesfehervár, Temesvár, Újvidék, Versecz, Zombor, and Budapest, the capital of the country. In Croatia-Slavonia, there were four: Osijek, Varaždin and Zagreb and Zemun. Fiume continued to form a separate division.

The administration of the municipalities was carried on by an official appointed by the king. These municipalities each had a council of twenty members.
Counties were led by a County head ( or ) appointed by the king and under the control of the Ministry of the Interior. Each county had a municipal committee of 20 members, comprising 50% virilists (persons paying the highest direct taxes) and 50% elected persons fulfilling the prescribed census and ex officio members (deputy county head, main notary, and others). The powers and responsibilities of the counties were constantly decreased and were transferred to regional agencies of the kingdom's ministries.

Government of the Bosnia and Herzegovina condominium

The Government of Bosnia and Herzegovina was headed by a governor-general, who was both the head of the civil administration and the commander of the military forces based in Bosnia and Herzegovina. Due to the military functions of the position all nine governor-generals were army officers. The executive branch was headed by a National Council, which was chaired by the governor and contained the governor's deputy and chiefs of departments. At first, the government had only three departments, administrative, financial and legislative. Later, other departments, including construction, economics, education, religion, and technical, were founded as well. The administration of the country, together with the carrying out of the laws, devolved upon the Territorial Government in Sarajevo, which was subordinate and responsible to the Common Ministry of Finance. The existing administrative authorities of the Territory retained their previous organization and functions.

The Austrian-Hungarian authorities left the Ottoman division of Bosnia and Herzegovina untouched, and only changed the names of divisional units. Thus the Bosnia Vilayet was renamed Reichsland, sanjaks were renamed Kreise (Circuits), kazas were renamed Bezirke (Districts), and nahiyahs became Exposituren. There were six Kreise and 54 Bezirke. The heads of the Kreises were Kreiseleiters, and the heads of the Bezirke were Bezirkesleiters.

Judicial system

Cisleithania

The December Constitution of 1867 restored the rule of law, independence of the judiciary, and public jury trials in Austria. The system of general courts had the same four rungs it still has today:
 District courts;
 Regional courts;
 Higher regional courts;
 Supreme Court.
Habsburg subjects would from now on be able to take the State to court should it violate their fundamental rights. Since regular courts were still unable to overrule the bureaucracy, much less the legislature, these guarantees necessitated the creation of specialist courts that could:
 The Administrative Court, stipulated by the 1867 Basic Law on Judicial Power and implemented in 1876, had the power to review the legality of administrative acts, ensuring that the executive branch remained faithful to the principle of the rule of law.
 The Imperial Court, stipulated by the Basic Law on the Creation of an Imperial Court in 1867 and implemented in 1869, decided demarcation conflicts between courts and the bureaucracy, between its constituent territories, and between individual territories and the Empire. The Imperial Court also heard complaints of citizens who claimed to have been violated in their constitutional rights, although its powers were not cassatory: it could only vindicate the complainant by  the government to be in the wrong, not by actually voiding its wrongful decisions.
 The State Court held the Emperor's ministers accountable for political misconduct committed in office. Although the Emperor could not be taken to court, many of his decrees now depended on the relevant minister to countersign them. The double-pronged approach of making the Emperor dependent on his ministers and also making ministers criminally liable for bad outcomes would firstly enable, secondly motivate the ministers to put pressure on the monarch.

Transleithania
Judicial power was also independent of the executive in Hungary. After the Croatian–Hungarian Settlement of 1868, Croatia-Slavonia had its own independent judicial system (the Table of Seven was the court of last instance for Croatia-Slavonia with final civil and criminal jurisdiction). The judicial authorities in Hungary were:
 the district courts with single judges (458 in 1905);
 the county courts with collegiate judgeships (76 in number); to these were attached 15 jury courts for press offences. These were courts of first instance. In Croatia-Slavonia these were known as the court tables after 1874;
 Royal Tables (12 in number), which were courts of second instance, established at Budapest, Debrecen, Győr, Kassa, Kolozsvár, Marosvásárhely, Nagyvárad, Pécs, Pressburg, Szeged, Temesvár and Ban's Table at Zagreb.
 The Royal Supreme Court at Budapest, and the Supreme Court of Justice, or Table of Seven, at Zagreb, which were the highest judicial authorities. There were also a special commercial court at Budapest, a naval court at Fiume, and special army courts.

Bosnia and Herzegovina condominium
The Territorial Statute introduced the modern rights and laws in Bosnia–Herzegovina, and it guaranteed generally the civil rights of the inhabitants of the Territory, namely citizenship, personal liberty, protection by the competent judicial authorities, liberty of creed and conscience, preservation of the national individuality and language, freedom of speech, freedom of learning and education, inviolability of the domicile, secrecy of posts and telegraphs, inviolability of property, the right of petition, and finally the right of holding meetings.

The existing judicial authorities of the Territory retained their previous organization and functions.

Budget
Despite Austria and Hungary sharing a common currency, they were fiscally sovereign and independent entities. Since the beginnings of the personal union (from 1527), the government of the Kingdom of Hungary could preserve its separate and independent budget. After the revolution of 1848–1849, the Hungarian budget was amalgamated with the Austrian, and it was only after the Compromise of 1867 that Hungary obtained a separate budget.

Voting rights
Towards the end of the 19th century, the Austrian half of the dual monarchy began to move towards constitutionalism. A constitutional system with a parliament, the Reichsrat was created, and a bill of rights was enacted also in 1867. Suffrage to the Reichstag's lower house was gradually expanded until 1907, when equal suffrage for all male citizens was introduced.

The 1907 Cisleithanian legislative election were the first elections held under universal male suffrage, after an electoral reform abolishing tax-paying requirements for voters had been adopted by the council and was endorsed by Emperor Franz Joseph earlier in the year. However, seat allocations were based on tax revenues from the States.

Principal issues in the internal politics
The traditional aristocracy and land-based gentry class gradually faced increasingly wealthy men of the cities, who achieved wealth through trade and industrialization. The urban middle and upper class tended to seek their own power and supported progressive movements in the aftermath of revolutions in Europe.

As in the German Empire, the Austro-Hungarian Empire frequently used liberal economic policies and practices. From the 1860s, businessmen succeeded in industrializing parts of the Empire. Newly prosperous members of the bourgeoisie erected large homes and began to take prominent roles in urban life that rivaled the aristocracy's. In the early period, they encouraged the government to seek foreign investment to build up infrastructure, such as railroads, in aid of industrialization, transportation and communications, and development.

The influence of liberals in Austria, most of them ethnic Germans, weakened under the leadership of Count Eduard von Taaffe, the Austrian prime minister from 1879 to 1893. Taaffe used a coalition of clergy, conservatives and Slavic parties to weaken the liberals. In Bohemia, for example, he authorized Czech as an official language of the bureaucracy and school system, thus breaking the German speakers' monopoly on holding office. Such reforms encouraged other ethnic groups to push for greater autonomy as well. By playing nationalities off one another, the government ensured the monarchy's central role in holding together competing interest groups in an era of rapid change.

During the First World War, rising national sentiments and labour movements contributed to strikes, protests and civil unrest in the Empire. After the war, republican, national parties contributed to the disintegration and collapse of the monarchy in Austria and Hungary. Republics were established in Vienna and Budapest.

Legislation to help the working class emerged from Catholic conservatives. They turned to social reform by using Swiss and German models and intervening in private industry. In Germany, Chancellor Otto von Bismarck had used such policies to neutralize socialist promises. The Catholics studied the Swiss Factory Act of 1877, which limited working hours for everyone and provided maternity benefits, and German laws that insured workers against industrial risks inherent in the workplace. These served as the basis for Austria's 1885 Trade Code Amendment.

The Austro-Hungarian compromise and its supporters remained bitterly unpopular among the ethnic Hungarian voters, and the continuous electoral success of the pro-compromise Liberal Party frustrated many Hungarian voters. While the pro-compromise liberal parties were the most popular among ethnic minority voters, the Slovak, Serb, and Romanian minority parties remained unpopular among the ethnic minorities. The nationalist Hungarian parties, which were supported by the overwhelming majority of ethnic Hungarian voters, remained in the opposition, except from 1906 to 1910 where the nationalist Hungarian parties were able to form government.

Foreign affairs

The emperor officially had charge of foreign affairs. His minister of foreign affairs conducted diplomacy. See Ministers of the Imperial and Royal House and of Foreign Affairs of Austria-Hungary (1867–1918).

1866-1878: beyond Kleindeutschland
The Dual Monarchy was created in the wake of the losing war in 1866 with Prussia and Italy. The war was ended by the Peace of Prague (1866) which settled the German Question in favor of a Lesser German Solution. To rebuild Habsburg prestige and gain revenge against Prussia, Count Friedrich Ferdinand von Beust became foreign secretary (1866–1871). He hated Prussia's leader, Otto von Bismarck, who had repeatedly outmaneuvered him. Beust looked to France and negotiated with Emperor Napoleon III and Italy for an anti-Prussian alliance. No terms could be reached. The decisive victory of Prusso-German armies in the war of 1870 with France and the founding of the German Empire ended all hope of revenge and Beust retired.

After being forced out of Germany and Italy, the Dual Monarchy turned to the Balkans, which were in tumult as nationalistic movements were gaining strength and demanding independence. Both Russia and Austria–Hungary saw an opportunity to expand in this region. Russia took on the role of protector of Slavs and Orthodox Christians. Austria envisioned a multi-ethnic, religiously diverse empire under Vienna's control. Count Gyula Andrássy, a Hungarian who was Foreign Minister (1871 to 1879), made the centerpiece of his policy one of opposition to Russian expansion in the Balkans and blocking Serbian ambitions to dominate a new South Slav federation. He wanted Germany to ally with Austria, not Russia.

1878–1914: Congress of Berlin, Balkan instability and the Bosnia Crisis

Russian Pan-Slavic organizations sent aid to the Balkan rebels and so pressured the tsar's government to declare war on the Ottoman Empire in 1877 in the name of protecting Orthodox Christians. Unable to mediate between the Ottoman Empire and Russia over the control of Serbia, Austria–Hungary declared neutrality when the conflict between the two powers escalated into a war. With help from Romania and Greece, Russia defeated the Ottomans and with the Treaty of San Stefano tried to create a large pro-Russian Bulgaria. This treaty sparked an international uproar that almost resulted in a general European war. Austria–Hungary and Britain feared that a large Bulgaria would become a Russian satellite that would enable the tsar to dominate the Balkans. British prime minister Benjamin Disraeli moved warships into position against Russia to halt the advance of Russian influence in the eastern Mediterranean so close to Britain's route through the Suez Canal.

When Russia defeated Turkey in a war the resulting Treaty of San Stefano was seen in Austria as much too favourable for Russia and its Orthodox-Slavic goals. The Congress of Berlin rolled back the Russian victory by partitioning the large Bulgarian state that Russia had carved out of Ottoman territory and denying any part of Bulgaria full independence from the Ottomans. The Congress of Berlin in 1878 let Austria occupy (but not annex) the province of Bosnia and Herzegovina, a predominantly Slavic area. Austria occupied Bosnia and Herzegovina as a way of gaining power in the Balkans. Serbia, Montenegro and Romania became fully independent. Nonetheless, the Balkans remained a site of political unrest with teeming ambition for independence and great power rivalries. At the Congress of Berlin in 1878 Gyula Andrássy (Minister of Foreign Affairs) managed to force Russia to retreat from further demands in the Balkans. As a result, Greater Bulgaria was broken up and Serbian independence was guaranteed. In that year, with Britain's support, Austria–Hungary stationed troops in Bosnia to prevent the Russians from expanding into nearby Serbia. In another measure to keep the Russians out of the Balkans, Austria–Hungary formed an alliance, the Mediterranean Entente, with Britain and Italy in 1887 and concluded mutual defence pacts with Germany in 1879 and Romania in 1883 against a possible Russian attack. Following the Congress of Berlin the European powers attempted to guarantee stability through a complex series of alliances and treaties.

Anxious about Balkan instability and Russian aggression, and to counter French interests in Europe, Austria–Hungary forged a defensive alliance with Germany in October 1879 and in May 1882. In October 1882 Italy joined this partnership in the Triple Alliance largely because of Italy's imperial rivalries with France. Tensions between Russia and Austria–Hungary remained high, so Bismarck replaced the League of the Three Emperors with the Reinsurance Treaty with Russia to keep the Habsburgs from recklessly starting a war over Pan-Slavism. The Sandžak-Raška / Novibazar region was under Austro-Hungarian occupation between 1878 and 1909, when it was returned to the Ottoman Empire, before being ultimately divided between kingdoms of Montenegro and Serbia.

On the heels of the Great Balkan Crisis, Austro-Hungarian forces occupied Bosnia and Herzegovina in August 1878 and the monarchy eventually annexed Bosnia and Herzegovina in October 1908 as a common holding of Cisleithania and Transleithania under the control of the Imperial & Royal finance ministry rather than attaching it to either territorial government. The annexation in 1908 led some in Vienna to contemplate combining Bosnia and Herzegovina with Croatia to form a third Slavic component of the monarchy. The deaths of Franz Joseph's brother, Maximilian (1867), and his only son, Rudolf, made the Emperor's nephew, Franz Ferdinand, heir to the throne. The Archduke was rumoured to have been an advocate for this trialism as a means to limit the power of the Hungarian aristocracy.

A proclamation issued on the occasion of its annexation to the Habsburg monarchy in October 1908 promised these lands constitutional institutions, which should secure to their inhabitants full civil rights and a share in the management of their own affairs by means of a local representative assembly. In performance of this promise a constitution was promulgated in 1910.

The principal players in the Bosnian Crisis of 1908-09 were the foreign ministers of Austria and Russia, Alois Lexa von Aehrenthal and Alexander Izvolsky. Both were motivated by political ambition; the first would emerge successful, and the latter would be broken by the crisis. Along the way, they would drag Europe to the brink of war in 1909. They would also divide Europe into the two armed camps that would go to war in July 1914.

Under the Treaty of Berlin, The Ottomans controlled the Dardanelles straight connecting the Mediterranean and the Black Sea. The Treaty prohibited the passage of any warships from any country into or out of the Black Sea. This treaty bottled up a major portion of the Russian Fleet, making it useless in the Russo-Japanese War of 1904-1905 when it was urgently needed. Izvolsky wanted this changed to allow the passage of Russian ships through the straits. Aehrenthal wanted full control of Bosnia-Herzogovina.Austria-Hungary had administered the provinces since 1878 but the Ottoman Empire remained the nominal legal owner. Aehrenthal concocted a grand diplomatic deal that proposed major benefits for both sides. Austria would gain full ownership of Bosnia with Russian approval. Turkey would get full control of the territory knoiwn as the Sanjak of Novi Pazar, plus cash. Russia would get the right of passage for its warships through the Straits. Serbia would get zero. Before approaching the Russians, Aehrenthal met with Austrian official and won the approval of Emperor Franz Joseph I. On September 15–16 Aehrenthal and Izvolsky held a secret meeting. No record was kept—and afterwards both sides remembered it very differently. Aehrenthal assumed he had full Russian approval for his scheme, but he not give out planned dates. Izvolsky assumed he would be informed before any actual move happened. Aehrenthal vaguely informed all the major countries but gave no details. The world was astonished on October 6, 1908, when a press release in Vienna announced that Bosnia was fully annexed. Inside Austria there was general approval except in Czech areas—that minority strongly felt its demands had been deliberately ignored. Aehrenthal had expected wide European approval and instead he faced a hostile volcanic eruption from every direction. Izvolsky vehemently denounced the treachery demanded an international conference on Bosnia. After decades of low level activity, pan-Slavic forces inside Russia suddenly mobilized in opposition. Mass demonstrations broke out across the continent. Rome took advantage of the situation by reversing its friendship with Vienna. Berlin officials were surprised and appalled. The British were especially angry, denouncing the violation of an international agreement signed by both Austria and Britain. France denounced the scheme. Turkey was surprised by the unexpected development, but it was quieted by the cash payment. By far the angriest reaction came from Serbia, which called for revenge, and began setting up secret guerrilla bands, plotting insurrection in Bosnia. All across Europe the chief blame was placed on Berlin, not Vienna. Europeans feared the powerful German army and took the episode as proof of its expansionist intentions. Berlin now realized it stood alone, with Austria its only friend. It therefore decided it would firmly support Austria despite doubts about the wisdom of annexing Bosnia, Berlin explicitly warned St Petersburg that continued demands for an international conference constituted a hostile action that increase the risk of war with Germany. Russia backed down. Thanks to the German intervention, Austria scored a complete short-term diplomatic success in taking control of Bosnia. in the long run however, Germany and Austria both made many too enemies, as the battle lines of World War I started to harden.

Aehrenthal had started with the assumption that the Slavic minorities could never come together, and the Balkan League Would never accomplish any damage to Austria. He turned down an Ottoman proposal for an alliance that would include Austria, Turkey and Romania. However his policies alienated the Bulgarians, who turned instead to Russia and Serbia. Although Austria had no intention to embark on additional expansion to the south, Aehrenthal encouraged speculation to that effect, expecting it would paralyze the Balkan states. Instead, it incited them to feverish activity to create a defensive block to stop Austria. A series of grave miscalculations at the highest level thus significantly strengthened Austria's enemies.

In 1914, Slavic militants in Bosnia rejected Austria's plan to fully absorb the area; they assassinated the Austrian heir and precipitated World War I.

Demographics

The following data is based on the official Austro-Hungarian census conducted in 1910.

Population and area

Languages

In Austria (Cisleithania), the census of 1910 recorded Umgangssprache, everyday language. Jews and those using German in offices often stated German as their Umgangssprache, even when having a different Muttersprache. 36.8% of the total population spoke German as their native language, and more than 71% of the inhabitants spoke some German.

In Hungary (Transleithania), where the census was based primarily on mother tongue, 48.1% of the total population spoke Hungarian as their native language. Not counting autonomous Croatia-Slavonia, more than 54.4% of the inhabitants of the Kingdom of Hungary were native speakers of Hungarian (this included also the Jewsaround 5% of the populationas mostly they were Hungarian-speaking).

Note that some languages were considered dialects of more widely spoken languages. For example: in the census, Rhaeto-Romance languages were counted as "Italian", while Istro-Romanian was counted as "Romanian". Yiddish was counted as "German" in both Austria and Hungary.
 

Historical regions:

Religion

Solely in the Empire of Austria:

Solely in the Kingdom of Hungary:

Largest cities
Data: census in 1910

Ethnic relations

In July 1849, the Hungarian Revolutionary Parliament proclaimed and enacted ethnic and minority rights (the next such laws were in Switzerland), but these were overturned after the Russian and Austrian armies crushed the Hungarian Revolution. After the Kingdom of Hungary reached the Compromise with the Habsburg Dynasty in 1867, one of the first acts of its restored Parliament was to pass a Law on Nationalities (Act Number XLIV of 1868). It was a liberal piece of legislation and offered extensive language and cultural rights. It did not recognize non-Hungarians to have rights to form states with any territorial autonomy.

The "Austro-Hungarian Compromise of 1867" created the personal union of the independent states of Hungary and Austria, linked under a common monarch also having joint institutions. The Hungarian majority asserted more of their identity within the Kingdom of Hungary, and it came to conflict with some of her own minorities. The imperial power of German-speakers who controlled the Austrian half was resented by others. In addition, the emergence of nationalism in the newly independent Romania and Serbia also contributed to ethnic issues in the empire.

Article 19 of the 1867 "Basic State Act" (Staatsgrundgesetz), valid only for the Cisleithanian (Austrian) part of Austria–Hungary, said:

The implementation of this principle led to several disputes, as it was not clear which languages could be regarded as "customary". The Germans, the traditional bureaucratic, capitalist and cultural elite, demanded the recognition of their language as a customary language in every part of the empire. German nationalists, especially in the Sudetenland (part of Bohemia), looked to Berlin in the new German Empire. There was a German-speaking element in Austria proper (west of Vienna), but it did not display much sense of German nationalism. That is, it did not demand an independent state; rather it flourished by holding most of the high military and diplomatic offices in the Empire.

Italian was regarded as an old "culture language" by German intellectuals and had always been granted equal rights as an official language of the Empire, but the Germans had difficulty in accepting the Slavic languages as equal to their own. On one occasion Count A. Auersperg (Anastasius Grün) entered the Diet of Carniola carrying what he claimed to be the whole corpus of Slovene literature under his arm; this was to demonstrate that the Slovene language could not be substituted for German as the language of higher education.

The following years saw official recognition of several languages, at least in Austria. From 1867, laws awarded Croatian equal status with Italian in Dalmatia. From 1882, there was a Slovene majority in the Diet of Carniola and in the capital Laibach (Ljubljana); they replaced German with Slovene as their primary official language. Galicia designated Polish instead of German in 1869 as the customary language of government.

In Istria, the Istro-Romanians, a small ethnic group composed by around 2,600 people in the 1880s, suffered severe discrimination. The Croats of the region, who formed the majority, tried to assimilate them, while the Italian minority supported them in their requests for self-determination. In 1888, the possibility of opening the first school for the Istro-Romanians teaching in the Romanian language was discussed in the Diet of Istria. The proposal was very popular among them. The Italian deputies showed their support, but the Croat ones opposed it and tried to show that the Istro-Romanians were in fact Slavs. During Austro-Hungarian rule, the Istro-Romanians lived under poverty conditions, and those living in the island of Krk were fully assimilated by 1875.

The language disputes were most fiercely fought in Bohemia, where the Czech speakers formed a majority and sought equal status for their language to German. The Czechs had lived primarily in Bohemia since the 6th century and German immigrants had begun settling the Bohemian periphery in the 13th century. The constitution of 1627 made the German language a second official language and equal to Czech. German speakers lost their majority in the Bohemian Diet in 1880 and became a minority to Czech speakers in the cities of Prague and Pilsen (while retaining a slight numerical majority in the city of Brno (Brünn)). The old Charles University in Prague, hitherto dominated by German speakers, was divided into German and Czech-speaking faculties in 1882.

At the same time, Hungarian dominance faced challenges from the local majorities of Romanians in Transylvania and in the eastern Banat, Slovaks in today's Slovakia, and Croats and Serbs in the crown lands of Croatia and of Dalmatia (today's Croatia), in Bosnia and Herzegovina and in the provinces known as the Vojvodina (today's northern Serbia). The Romanians and the Serbs began to agitate for union with their fellow nationalists and language speakers in the newly founded states of Romania (1859–1878) and Serbia.

Hungary's leaders were generally less willing than their Austrian counterparts to share power with their subject minorities, but they granted a large measure of autonomy to Croatia in 1868. To some extent, they modeled their relationship to that kingdom on their own compromise with Austria of the previous year. In spite of nominal autonomy, the Croatian government was an economic and administrative part of Hungary, which the Croatians resented. In the Kingdom of Croatia-Slavonia and Bosnia and Herzegovina many advocated the idea of a trialist Austro-Hungaro-Croatian monarchy; among the supporters of the idea were Archduke Leopold Salvator, Archduke Franz Ferdinand and emperor and king Charles I who during his short reign supported the trialist idea only to be vetoed by the Hungarian government and Count Istvan Tisza. The count finally signed the trialist proclamation after heavy pressure from the king on 23 October 1918.

Language was one of the most contentious issues in Austro-Hungarian politics. All governments faced difficult and divisive hurdles in deciding on the languages of government and of instruction. The minorities sought the widest opportunities for education in their own languages, as well as in the "dominant" languages—Hungarian and German. By the "Ordinance of 5 April 1897", the Austrian Prime Minister Count Kasimir Felix Badeni gave Czech equal standing with German in the internal government of Bohemia; this led to a crisis because of nationalist German agitation throughout the empire. The Crown dismissed Badeni.

The Hungarian Minority Act of 1868 gave the minorities (Slovaks, Romanians, Serbs, et al.) individual (but not also communal) rights to use their language in offices, schools (although in practice often only in those founded by them and not by the state), courts and municipalities (if 20% of the deputies demanded it). Beginning with the 1879 Primary Education Act and the 1883 Secondary Education Act, the Hungarian state made more efforts to reduce the use of non-Magyar languages, in strong violation of the 1868 Nationalities Law. After 1875, all Slovak language schools higher than elementary were closed, including the only three high schools (gymnasiums) in Revúca (Nagyrőce), Turčiansky Svätý Martin (Turócszentmárton) and Kláštor pod Znievom (Znióváralja). From June 1907, all public and private schools in Hungary were obliged to ensure that after the fourth grade, the pupils could express themselves fluently in Hungarian. This led to the further closing of minority schools, devoted mostly to the Slovak and Rusyn languages.

The two kingdoms sometimes divided their spheres of influence. According to Misha Glenny in his book, The Balkans, 1804–1999, the Austrians responded to Hungarian support of Czechs by supporting the Croatian national movement in Zagreb.

In recognition that he reigned in a multi-ethnic country, Emperor Franz Joseph spoke (and used) German, Hungarian and Czech fluently, and Croatian, Serbian, Polish and Italian to some degree.

Jews

Around 1900, Jews numbered about two million in the whole territory of the Austro-Hungarian Empire; their position was ambiguous. The populist and antisemitic politics of the Christian Social Party are sometimes viewed as a model for Adolf Hitler's Nazism. Antisemitic parties and movements existed, but the governments of Vienna and Budapest did not initiate pogroms or implement official antisemitic policies. They feared that such ethnic violence could ignite other ethnic minorities and escalate out of control. The antisemitic parties remained on the periphery of the political sphere due to their low popularity among voters in the parliamentary elections.

In that period, the majority of Jews in Austria–Hungary lived in small towns (shtetls) in Galicia and rural areas in Hungary and Bohemia; however, they had large communities and even local majorities in the downtown districts of Vienna, Budapest, Prague, Kraków and Lwów. Of the pre-World War I military forces of the major European powers, the Austro-Hungarian army was almost alone in its regular promotion of Jews to positions of command. While the Jewish population of the lands of the Dual Monarchy was about 5%, Jews made up nearly 18% of the reserve officer corps. Thanks to the modernity of the constitution and to the benevolence of emperor Franz Joseph, the Austrian Jews came to regard the era of Austria–Hungary as a golden era of their history. By 1910 about 900,000 religious Jews made up approximately 5% of the population of Hungary and about 23% of Budapest's citizenry. Jews accounted for 54% of commercial business owners, 85% of financial institution directors and owners in banking, and 62% of all employees in commerce, 20% of all general grammar school students, and 37% of all commercial scientific grammar school students, 31.9% of all engineering students, and 34.1% of all students in human faculties of the universities. Jews were accounted for 48.5% of all physicians, and 49.4% of all lawyers/jurists in Hungary. Note: The numbers of Jews were reconstructed from religious censuses. They did not include the people of Jewish origin who had converted to Christianity, or the number of atheists. Among many Hungarian parliament members of Jewish origin, the most famous Jewish members in Hungarian political life were Vilmos Vázsonyi as Minister of Justice, Samu Hazai as Minister of War, János Teleszky as minister of finance, János Harkányi as minister of trade, and József Szterényi as minister of trade.

Education

Primary and secondary education in Cisleithania

The organization of the Austrian elementary schools was based on the principle of compulsory school attendance, free education, and the imparting of public instruction in the child's own language. Side by side with these existed private schools. The proportion of children attending private schools to those attending the public elementary schools in 1912 was 144,000 to 4.5 millions, i.e. a thirtieth part. Hence the accusation of denationalizing children through the Schulvereine must be accepted with caution. The expenses of education were distributed as follows: the communes built the schoolhouses, the political sub-districts (Bezirke) paid the teachers, the Crown territory gave a grant, and the State appointed the inspectors. Since the State supervised the schools without maintaining them, it was able to increase its demands without being hampered by financial considerations. It is remarkable that the difference between the State educational estimates in Austria and in Hungary was one of 9.3 millions in the former as opposed to 67.6 in the latter. Under Austria, since everywhere that 40 scholars of one nationality were to be found within a radius of 5 km. a school had to be set up in which their language was used, national schools were assured even to linguistic minorities. It is true that this mostly happened at the expense of the German industrial communities, since the Slav labourers as immigrants acquired schools in their own language. The number of elementary schools increased from 19,016 in 1900 to 24,713 in 1913; the number of scholars from 3,490,000 in 1900 to 4,630,000 in 1913.

Universities in Cisleithania
The first university in the Austrian half of the Empire (Charles University) was founded by H.R. Emperor Charles IV in Prague in 1347, the second oldest university was the Jagiellonian University established in Kraków by the King of Poland Casimir III the Great in 1364, while the third oldest (University of Vienna) was founded by Duke Rudolph IV in 1365.

The higher educational institutions were predominantly German, but beginning in the 1870s, language shifts began to occur. These establishments, which in the middle of the 19th century had had a predominantly German character, underwent in Galicia a conversion into Polish national institutions, in Bohemia and Moravia a separation into German and Czech ones. Thus Germans, Czechs and Poles were provided for. But now the smaller nations also made their voices heard: the Ruthenians, Slovenes and Italians. The Ruthenians demanded at first, in view of the predominantly Ruthenian character of rural East Galicia, a national partition of the Polish University of Lwów. Since the Poles were at first unyielding, Ruthenian demonstrations and strikes of students arose, and the Ruthenians were no longer content with the reversion of a few separate professorial chairs, and with parallel courses of lectures. By a pact concluded on 28 January 1914 the Poles promised a Ruthenian university; but owing to the war the question lapsed. The Italians could hardly claim a university of their own on grounds of population (in 1910 they numbered 783,000), but they claimed it all the more on grounds of their ancient culture. All parties were agreed that an Italian faculty of laws should be created; the difficulty lay in the choice of the place. The Italians demanded Trieste; but the Government was afraid to let this Adriatic port become the centre of an irredenta; moreover the Southern Slavs of the city wished it kept free from an Italian educational establishment. Bienerth in 1910 brought about a compromise; namely, that it should be founded at once, the situation to be provisionally in Vienna, and to be transferred within four years to Italian national territory. The German National Union (Nationalverband) agreed to extend temporary hospitality to the Italian university in Vienna, but the Southern Slav Hochschule Club demanded a guarantee that a later transfer to the coast provinces should not be contemplated, together with the simultaneous foundation of Slovene professorial chairs in Prague and Cracow, and preliminary steps towards the foundation of a Southern Slav university in Laibach. But in spite of the constant renewal of negotiations for a compromise it was impossible to arrive at any agreement, until the outbreak of war left all the projects for a Ruthenian university at Lemberg, a Slovene one in Laibach, and a second Czech one in Moravia, unrealized.

Primary and secondary education in Transleithania 

One of the first measures of newly established Hungarian government was to provide supplementary schools of a non-denominational character. By a law passed in 1868 attendance at school was obligatory for all children between the ages of 6 and 12 years. The communes or parishes were bound to maintain elementary schools, and they were entitled to levy an additional tax of 5% on the state taxes for their maintenance. But the number of state-aided elementary schools was continually increasing, as the spread of the Magyar language to the other races through the medium of the elementary schools was one of the principal concerns of the Hungarian government, and was vigorously pursued. In 1902 there were in Hungary 18,729 elementary schools with 32,020 teachers, attended by 2,573,377 pupils, figures which compare favourably with those of 1877, when there were 15,486 schools with 20,717 teachers, attended by 1,559,636 pupils. In about 61% of these schools the language used was exclusively Magyar, in about 6 20% it was mixed, and in the remainder some non-Magyar language was used. In 1902, 80.56% of the children of school age actually attended school. Since 1891 infant schools, for children between the ages of 3 and 6 years, were maintained either by the communes or by the state.

The public instruction of Hungary contained three other groups of educational institutions: middle or secondary schools, "high schools" and technical schools. The middle schools comprised classical schools (gymnasia) which were preparatory for the universities and other "high schools", and modern schools (Realschulen) preparatory for the technical schools. Their course of study was generally eight years, and they were maintained mostly by the state. The state-maintained gymnasia were mostly of recent foundation, but some schools maintained by the various churches had been in existence for three or sometimes four centuries. The number of middle schools in 1902 was 243 with 4705 teachers, attended by 71,788 pupils; in 1880 their number was 185, attended by 40,747 pupils.

Universities in Transleithania
In the year 1276, the university of Veszprém was destroyed by the troops of Péter Csák and it was never rebuilt. A university was established by Louis I of Hungary in Pécs in 1367. Sigismund established a university at Óbuda in 1395. Another, Universitas Istropolitana, was established 1465 in Pozsony (now Bratislava in Slovakia) by Mattias Corvinus. None of these medieval universities survived the Ottoman wars. Nagyszombat University was founded in 1635 and moved to Buda in 1777 and it is called Eötvös Loránd University today. The world's first institute of technology was founded in Selmecbánya, Kingdom of Hungary (since 1920 Banská Štiavnica, now Slovakia) in 1735. Its legal successor is the University of Miskolc in Hungary. The Budapest University of Technology and Economics (BME) is considered the oldest institute of technology in the world with university rank and structure. Its legal predecessor the Institutum Geometrico-Hydrotechnicum was founded in 1782 by Emperor Joseph II.

The high schools included the universities, of which Hungary possessed five, all maintained by the state: at Budapest (founded in 1635), at Kolozsvár (founded in 1872), and at Zagreb (founded in 1874). Newer universities were established in Debrecen in 1912, and Pozsony university was reestablished after a half millennium in 1912. They had four faculties: theology, law, philosophy and medicine (the university at Zagreb was without a faculty of medicine). There were in addition ten high schools of law, called academies, which in 1900 were attended by 1,569 pupils. The Polytechnicum in Budapest, founded in 1844, which contained four faculties and was attended in 1900 by 1,772 pupils, was also considered a high school. There were in Hungary in 1900 forty-nine theological colleges, twenty-nine Catholic, five Greek Uniat, four Greek Orthodox, ten Protestant and one Jewish. Among special schools the principal mining schools were at Selmeczbánya, Nagyág and Felsőbánya; the principal agricultural colleges at Debreczen and Kolozsvár; and there was a school of forestry at Selmeczbánya, military colleges at Budapest, Kassa, Déva and Zagreb, and a naval school at Fiume. There were in addition a number of training institutes for teachers and a large number of schools of commerce, several art schools – for design, painting, sculpture, music

Economy

Overview

The heavily rural Austro-Hungarian economy slowly modernised after 1867. Railroads opened up once-remote areas, and cities grew. Many small firms promoted capitalist way of production. Technological change accelerated industrialization and urbanization. The first Austrian stock exchange (the Wiener Börse) was opened in 1771 in Vienna, the first stock exchange of the Kingdom of Hungary (the Budapest Stock Exchange) was opened in Budapest in 1864. The central bank (Bank of issue) was founded as Austrian National Bank in 1816. In 1878, it transformed into Austro-Hungarian National Bank with principal offices in both Vienna and Budapest. The central bank was governed by alternating Austrian or Hungarian governors and vice-governors.

The gross national product per capita grew roughly 1.76% per year from 1870 to 1913. That level of growth compared very favorably to that of other European nations such as Britain (1%), France (1.06%), and Germany (1.51%). However, in a comparison with Germany and Britain, the Austro-Hungarian economy as a whole still lagged considerably, as sustained modernization had begun much later. Like the German Empire, that of Austria–Hungary frequently employed liberal economic policies and practices. In 1873, the old Hungarian capital Buda and Óbuda (Ancient Buda) were officially merged with the third city, Pest, thus creating the new metropolis of Budapest. The dynamic Pest grew into Hungary's administrative, political, economic, trade and cultural hub. Many of the state institutions and the modern administrative system of Hungary were established during this period. Economic growth centered on Vienna and Budapest, the Austrian lands (areas of modern Austria), the Alpine region and the Bohemian lands. In the later years of the 19th century, rapid economic growth spread to the central Hungarian plain and to the Carpathian lands. As a result, wide disparities of development existed within the empire. In general, the western areas became more developed than the eastern ones. The Kingdom of Hungary became the world's second-largest flour exporter after the United States. The large Hungarian food exports were not limited to neighbouring Germany and Italy: Hungary became the most important foreign food supplier of the large cities and industrial centres of the United Kingdom. Galicia, which has been described as the poorest province of Austro-Hungary, experienced near-constant famines, resulting in 50,000 deaths a year. The Istro-Romanians of Istria were also poor, as pastoralism lost strength and agriculture was not productive.

However, by the end of the 19th century, economic differences gradually began to even out as economic growth in the eastern parts of the monarchy consistently surpassed that in the western. The strong agriculture and food industry of the Kingdom of Hungary with the centre of Budapest became predominant within the empire and made up a large proportion of the export to the rest of Europe. Meanwhile, western areas, concentrated mainly around Prague and Vienna, excelled in various manufacturing industries. This division of labour between the east and west, besides the existing economic and monetary union, led to an even more rapid economic growth throughout Austria–Hungary by the early 20th century. However, since the turn of the twentieth century, the Austrian half of the Monarchy could preserve its dominance within the empire in the sectors of the first industrial revolution, but Hungary had a better position in the industries of the second industrial revolution, in these modern sectors of the second industrial revolution the Austrian competition could not become dominant.

Trade
From 1527 (the creation of the monarchic personal union) to 1851, the Kingdom of Hungary maintained its own customs controls, which separated it from the other parts of the Habsburg-ruled territories. After 1867, the Austrian and Hungarian customs union agreement had to be renegotiated and stipulated every ten years. The agreements were renewed and signed by Vienna and Budapest at the end of every decade because both countries hoped to derive mutual economic benefit from the customs union. The Austrian Empire and the Kingdom of Hungary contracted their foreign commercial treaties independently of each other.

Industry
The empire's heavy industry had mostly focused on machine building, especially for the electric power industry, locomotive industry and automotive industry, while in light industry the precision mechanics industry was the most dominant. Through the years leading up to World War I the country became the 4th biggest machine manufacturer in the world.

The two most important trading partners were traditionally Germany (1910: 48% of all exports, 39% of all imports), and Great Britain (1910: almost 10% of all exports, 8% of all imports), the third most important partner was the United States, it followed by Russia, France, Switzerland, Romania, the Balkan states and South America. Trade with the geographically neighbouring Russia, however, had a relatively low weight (1910: 3% of all exports /mainly machinery for Russia, 7% of all imports /mainly raw materials from Russia).

Automotive industry
Prior to World War I, the Austrian Empire had five car manufacturer companies. These were: Austro-Daimler in Wiener-Neustadt (cars trucks, buses), Gräf & Stift in Vienna (cars), Laurin & Klement in Mladá Boleslav (motorcycles, cars), Nesselsdorfer in Nesselsdorf (Kopřivnice), Moravia (automobiles), and Lohner-Werke in Vienna (cars). Austrian car production started in 1897.

Prior to World War I, the Kingdom of Hungary had four car manufacturer companies. These were: the Ganz company in Budapest, RÁBA Automobile in Győr, MÁG (later Magomobil) in Budapest, and MARTA (Hungarian Automobile Joint-stock Company Arad) in Arad. Hungarian car production started in 1900. Automotive factories in the Kingdom of Hungary manufactured motorcycles, cars, taxicabs, trucks and buses.

Electrical industry and electronics
In 1884, Károly Zipernowsky, Ottó Bláthy and Miksa Déri (ZBD), three engineers associated with the Ganz Works of Budapest, determined that open-core devices were impractical, as they were incapable of reliably regulating voltage.
When employed in parallel connected electric distribution systems, closed-core transformers finally made it technically and economically feasible to provide electric power for lighting in homes, businesses and public spaces. The other essential milestone was the introduction of 'voltage source, voltage intensive' (VSVI) systems' by the invention of constant voltage generators in 1885.
Bláthy had suggested the use of closed cores, Zipernowsky had suggested the use of parallel shunt connections, and Déri had performed the experiments;

The first Hungarian water turbine was designed by the engineers of the Ganz Works in 1866, the mass production with dynamo generators started in 1883. The manufacturing of steam turbo generators started in the Ganz Works in 1903.

In 1905, the Láng Machine Factory company also started the production of steam turbines for alternators.

Tungsram is a Hungarian manufacturer of light bulbs and vacuum tubes since 1896. On 13 December 1904, Hungarian Sándor Just and Croatian Franjo Hanaman were granted a Hungarian patent (No. 34541) for the world's first tungsten filament lamp. The tungsten filament lasted longer and gave brighter light than the traditional carbon filament. Tungsten filament lamps were first marketed by the Hungarian company Tungsram in 1904. This type is often called Tungsram-bulbs in many European countries.

Despite the long experimentation with vacuum tubes at Tungsram company, the mass production of radio tubes begun during WW1, and the production of X-ray tubes started also during the WW1 in Tungsram Company.

The Orion Electronics was founded in 1913. Its main profiles were the production of electrical switches, sockets, wires, incandescent lamps, electric fans, electric kettles, and various household electronics.

The telephone exchange was an idea of the Hungarian engineer Tivadar Puskás (1844–1893) in 1876, while he was working for Thomas Edison on a telegraph exchange.

The first Hungarian telephone factory (Factory for Telephone Apparatuses) was founded by János Neuhold in Budapest in 1879, which produced telephones microphones, telegraphs, and telephone exchanges.

In 1884, the Tungsram company also started to produce microphones, telephone apparatuses, telephone switchboards and cables.

The Ericsson company also established a factory for telephones and switchboards in Budapest in 1911.

Aeronautic industry
The first airplane in Austria was Edvard Rusjan's design, the Eda I, which had its maiden flight in the vicinity of Gorizia on 25 November 1909.

The first Hungarian hydrogen-filled experimental balloons were built by István Szabik and József Domin in 1784.
The first Hungarian designed and produced airplane (powered by a Hungarian built inline engine) was flown at Rákosmező on 4 November 1909. The earliest Hungarian airplane with Hungarian built radial engine was flown in 1913. Between 1912 and 1918, the Hungarian aircraft industry began developing. The three greatest: UFAG Hungarian Aircraft Factory (1914), Hungarian General Aircraft Factory (1916), Hungarian Lloyd Aircraft, Engine Factory at Aszód (1916), and Marta in Arad (1914). During the First World War, fighter planes, bombers and reconnaissance planes were produced in these factories. The most important aero-engine factories were Weiss Manfred Works, GANZ Works, and Hungarian Automobile Joint-stock Company Arad.

Rolling stock manufacturers
The factories producing rolling stock such as locomotives, steam engines and wagons, but also bridges and other iron structures, were installed in Vienna (Locomotive Factory of the State Railway Company, founded in 1839), in Wiener Neustadt (New Vienna Locomotive Factory, founded in 1841), and in Floridsdorf (Floridsdorf Locomotive Factory, founded in 1869).

The Hungarian factories producing rolling stock as well as bridges and other iron structures were the MÁVAG company in Budapest (steam engines and wagons) and the Ganz company in Budapest (steam engines, wagons, the production of electric locomotives and electric trams started from 1894). and the RÁBA Company in Győr.

Shipbuilding
The largest shipyard in the dual monarchy and a strategic asset for the Austro-Hungarian Navy was the Stabilimento Tecnico Triestino in Trieste, founded in 1857 by Wilhelm Strudthoff. Second in importance was the Danubius Werft in Fiume (present-day Rijeka, Croatia). Third in importance for the naval shipbuilding was the Navy's own Marinearsenal, located at the main naval base in Pola, present-day Croatia. The latter was established in 1854 under the name Stabilimento Tecnico Fiume with Robert Whitehead as the enterprise's director and the purpose to produce his torpedoes for the Navy. The company went bankrupt in 1874 and in the following year Whitehead bought it to establish the Whitehead & Co. Next to torpedoes the company went on to produce submarines during WWI. On the Danube, the DDSG had established the Óbuda Shipyard on the Hungarian Hajógyári Island in 1835. The largest Hungarian shipbuilding company was the Ganz-Danubius.

Infrastructure

Telecommunications

Telegraph
The first telegraph connection (Vienna—Brno—Prague) had started operation in 1847. In Hungarian territory the first telegraph stations were opened in Pressburg (Pozsony, today's Bratislava) in December 1847 and in Buda in 1848. The first telegraph connection between Vienna and Pest–Buda (later Budapest) was constructed in 1850, and Vienna–Zagreb in 1850.

Austria subsequently joined a telegraph union with German states. In the Kingdom of Hungary, 2,406 telegraph post offices operated in 1884. By 1914 the number of telegraph offices reached 3,000 in post offices and further 2,400 were installed in the railway stations of the Kingdom of Hungary.

Telephone
The first telephone exchange was opened in Zagreb (8 January 1881), the second was in Budapest (1 May 1881), and the third was opened in Vienna (3 June 1881). Initially telephony was available in the homes of individual subscribers, companies and offices. Public telephone stations appeared in the 1890s, and they quickly became widespread in post offices and railway stations. Austria–Hungary had 568 million telephone calls in 1913; only two Western European countries had more phone calls: the German Empire and the United Kingdom. The Austro-Hungarian Empire was followed by France with 396 million telephone calls and Italy with 230 million phone calls. In 1916, there were 366 million telephone calls in Cisleithania, among them 8.4 million long distant calls. All telephone exchanges of the cities, towns and larger villages in Transleithania were linked until 1893. By 1914, more than 2000 settlements had telephone exchange in Kingdom of Hungary.

Electronic audio broadcasting

The Telefon Hírmondó (Telephone Herald) news and entertainment service was introduced in Budapest in 1893. Two decades before the introduction of radio broadcasting, people could listen to political, economic and sports news, cabaret, music and opera in Budapest daily. It operated over a special type of telephone exchange system.

Rail transport

By 1913, the combined length of the railway tracks of the Austrian Empire and Kingdom of Hungary reached . In Western Europe only Germany had more extended railway network; the Austro-Hungarian Empire was followed by France, the United Kingdom, Italy and Spain.

Railways in Cisleithania
Rail transport expanded rapidly in the Austro-Hungarian Empire. Its predecessor state, the Habsburg Empire, had built a substantial core of railways in the west, originating from Vienna, by 1841. Austria's first steam railway from Vienna to Moravia with its terminus in Galicia (Bochnie) was opened in 1839. The first train travelled from Vienna to Lundenburg (Břeclav) on 6 June 1839 and one month later between the imperial capital in Vienna and the capital of Moravia Brünn (Brno) on 7 July. At that point, the government realized the military possibilities of rail and began to invest heavily in construction. Pozsony (Bratislava), Budapest, Prague, Kraków, Lviv, Graz, Laibach (Ljubljana) and Venedig (Venice) became linked to the main network. By 1854, the empire had almost  of track, about 60–70% of it in state hands. The government then began to sell off large portions of track to private investors to recoup some of its investments and because of the financial strains of the 1848 Revolution and of the Crimean War.

From 1854 to 1879, private interests conducted almost all rail construction. What would become Cisleithania gained  of track, and Hungary built  of track. During this time, many new areas joined the railway system and the existing rail networks gained connections and interconnections. This period marked the beginning of widespread rail transportation in Austria–Hungary, and also the integration of transportation systems in the area. Railways allowed the empire to integrate its economy far more than previously possible, when transportation depended on rivers.

After 1879, the Austrian and the Hungarian governments slowly began to renationalize their rail networks, largely because of the sluggish pace of development during the worldwide depression of the 1870s. Most of this constituted "filling in" of the existing network, although some areas, primarily in the far east, gained rail connections for the first time. The railway reduced transportation costs throughout the empire, opening new markets for products from other lands of the Dual Monarchy.

Railways in Transleithania
The first Hungarian steam locomotive railway line was opened on 15 July 1846 between Pest and Vác. In 1890 most large Hungarian private railway companies were nationalized as a consequence of the poor management of private companies, except the strong Austrian-owned Kaschau-Oderberg Railway (KsOd) and the Austrian-Hungarian Southern Railway (SB/DV). They also joined the zone tariff system of the MÁV (Hungarian State Railways). By 1910, the total length of the rail networks of Hungarian Kingdom reached , the Hungarian network linked more than 1,490 settlements. Nearly half (52%) of the empire's railways were built in Hungary, thus the railroad density there became higher than that of Cisleithania. This has ranked Hungarian railways the 6th most dense in the world (ahead of Germany and France).

Electrified commuter railways: A set of four electric commuter rai lines were built in Budapest, the BHÉV: Ráckeve line (1887), Szentendre line (1888), Gödöllő line (1888), Csepel line (1912)

Tramway lines in the cities
Horse-drawn tramways appeared in the first half of the 19th century. Between the 1850s and 1880s many were built : Vienna (1865), Budapest (1866), Brno (1869), Trieste (1876). Steam trams appeared in the late 1860s. The electrification of tramways started in the late 1880s. The first electrified tramway in Austria–Hungary was built in Budapest in 1887.

Electric tramway lines in the Austrian Empire:
 Austria: Gmunden (1894); Linz, Vienna (1897); Graz (1898); Trieste (1900); Ljubljana (1901); Innsbruck (1905); Unterlach, Ybbs an der Donau (1907); Salzburg (1909); Klagenfurt, Sankt Pölten (1911); Piran (1912)
 Austrian Littoral: Pula (1904).
 Bohemia: Prague (1891); Teplice (1895); Liberec (1897); Ústí nad Labem, Plzeň, Olomouc (1899); Moravia, Brno, Jablonec nad Nisou (1900); Ostrava (1901); Mariánské Lázně (1902); Budějovice, České Budějovice, Jihlava (1909)
 Austrian Silesia: Opava (Troppau) (1905), Cieszyn (Cieszyn) (1911)
 Dalmatia: Dubrovnik (1910)
 Galicia: Lviv (1894), Bielsko-Biała (1895); Kraków (1901); Tarnów, Cieszyn (1911)

Electric tramway lines in the Kingdom of Hungary:
 Hungary: Budapest (1887); Pressburg/Pozsony/Bratislava (1895); Szabadka/Subotica (1897), Szombathely (1897), Miskolc (1897); Temesvár/Timișoara (1899); Sopron (1900); Szatmárnémeti/Satu Mare (1900); Nyíregyháza (1905); Nagyszeben/Sibiu (1905); Nagyvárad/Oradea (1906); Szeged (1908); Debrecen (1911); Újvidék/Novi Sad (1911); Kassa/Košice (1913); Pécs (1913)
 Croatia: Fiume (1899); Pula (1904); Opatija – Lovran (1908); Zagreb (1910); Dubrovnik (1910).

Underground

The Budapest Metro Line 1 (originally the "Franz Joseph Underground Electric Railway Company") is the second oldest underground railway in the world (the first being the London Underground's Metropolitan Line and the third being Glasgow), and the first on the European mainland. It was built from 1894 to 1896 and opened on 2 May 1896. In 2002, it was listed as a UNESCO World Heritage Site.
The M1 line became an IEEE Milestone due to the radically new innovations in its era: "Among the railway's innovative elements were bidirectional tram cars; electric lighting in the subway stations and tram cars; and an overhead wire structure instead of a third-rail system for power."

Inland waterways and river regulation
In 1900 the engineer C. Wagenführer drew up plans to link the Danube and the Adriatic Sea by a canal from Vienna to Trieste. It was born from the desire of Austria–Hungary to have a direct link to the Adriatic Sea but was never constructed.

Lower Danube and the Iron Gates
In 1831 a plan had already been drafted to make the passage navigable, at the initiative of the Hungarian politician István Széchenyi. Finally Gábor Baross, Hungary's "Iron Minister", succeeded in financing this project. The riverbed rocks and the associated rapids made the gorge valley an infamous passage for shipping. In German, the passage is still known as the Kataraktenstrecke, even though the cataracts are gone. Near the actual "Iron Gates" strait the Prigrada rock was the most important obstacle until 1896: the river widened considerably here and the water level was consequently low. Upstream, the Greben rock near the "Kazan" gorge was notorious.

Tisza River
The length of the Tisza in Hungary used to be . It flowed through the Great Hungarian Plain, which is one of the largest flat areas in central Europe. Since plains can cause a river to flow very slowly, the Tisza used to follow a path with many curves and turns, which led to many large floods in the area.

After several small-scale attempts, István Széchenyi organised the "regulation of the Tisza" (Hungarian: a Tisza szabályozása) which started on 27 August 1846, and substantially ended in 1880.

Shipping and ports

The most important seaport was Trieste (today part of Italy), where the Austrian merchant marine was based. Two major shipping companies (Austrian Lloyd and Austro-Americana) and several shipyards were located there. From 1815 to 1866, Venice had been part of the Habsburg empire. The loss of Venice prompted the development of the Austrian merchant marine. By 1913, the commercial marine of Austria, comprised 16,764 vessels with a tonnage of 471,252, and crews number-ing 45,567. Of the total (1913) 394 of 422,368 tons were steamers, and 16,370 of 48,884 tons were sailing vessels The Austrian Lloyd was one of the biggest ocean shipping companies of the time. Prior to the beginning of World War I, the company owned 65 middle-sized and large steamers. The Austro-Americana owned one third of this number, including the biggest Austrian passenger ship, the SS Kaiser Franz Joseph I. In comparison to the Austrian Lloyd, the Austro-American concentrated on destinations in North and South America. The Austro-Hungarian Navy became much more significant than previously, as industrialization provided sufficient revenues to develop it. Pola (Pula, today part of Croatia) was especially significant for the navy.

The most important seaport for the Hungarian part of the monarchy was Fiume (Rijeka, today part of Croatia), where the Hungarian shipping companies, such as the Adria, operated. The commercial marine of the Kingdom of Hungary in 1913 comprised 545 vessels of 144,433 tons, and crews numbering 3,217. Of the total number of vessels 134,000 of 142,539 tons were steamers, and 411 of 1,894 tons were sailing vessels. The first Danubian steamer company, Donaudampfschiffahrtsgesellschaft (DDSG), was the largest inland shipping company in the world until the collapse of Austria-Hungary.

Military

The Austro-Hungarian Army was under the command of Archduke Albrecht, Duke of Teschen (1817–1895), an old-fashioned bureaucrat who opposed modernization. The military system of the Austro-Hungarian monarchy was similar in both states, and rested since 1868 upon the principle of the universal and personal obligation of the citizen to bear arms. Its military force was composed of the common army; the special armies, namely the Austrian Landwehr, and the Hungarian Honved, which were separate national institutions, and the Landsturm or levy-en masse. As stated above, the common army stood under the administration of the joint minister of war, while the special armies were under the administration of the respective ministries of national defence. The yearly contingent of recruits for the army was fixed by the military bills voted on by the Austrian and Hungarian parliaments and was generally determined on the basis of the population, according to the last census returns. It amounted in 1905 to 103,100 men, of which Austria furnished 59,211 men, and Hungary 43,889. Besides 10,000 men were annually allotted to the Austrian Landwehr, and 12,500 to the Hungarian Honved. The term of service was two years (three years in the cavalry) with the colours, seven or eight in the reserve and two in the Landwehr; in the case of men not drafted to the active army the same total period of service was spent in various special reserves.

The common minister of war was the head for the administration of all military affairs, except those of the Austrian Landwehr and of the Hungarian Honved, which were committed to the ministries for national defence of the two respective states. But the supreme command of the army was nominally vested in the monarch, who had the power to take all measures regarding the whole army. In practice, the emperor's nephew Archduke Albrecht was his chief military advisor and made the policy decisions.

The Austro-Hungarian navy was mainly a coast defence force, and also included a flotilla of monitors for the Danube. It was administered by the naval department of the ministry of war.

Belligerence in World War I

Prelude

Sarajevo assassination 

On 28 June 1914, Archduke Franz Ferdinand visited the Bosnian capital, Sarajevo. A group of six assassins (Cvjetko Popović, Gavrilo Princip, Muhamed Mehmedbašić, Nedeljko Čabrinović, Trifko Grabež, Vaso Čubrilović) from the nationalist group Mlada Bosna, supplied by the Black Hand, had gathered on the street where the Archduke's motorcade would pass. Čabrinović threw a grenade at the car, but missed. It injured some people nearby, and Franz Ferdinand's convoy could carry on. The other assassins failed to act as the cars drove past them quickly. About an hour later, when Franz Ferdinand was returning from a visit at the Sarajevo Hospital, the convoy took a wrong turn into a street where Gavrilo Princip by coincidence stood. With a pistol, Princip shot and killed Franz Ferdinand and his wife Sophie. The reaction among the Austrian people was mild, almost indifferent. As historian Z. A. B. Zeman later wrote, "the event almost failed to make any impression whatsoever. On Sunday and Monday [June 28 and 29], the crowds in Vienna listened to music and drank wine, as if nothing had happened."

Escalation of violence in Bosnia

The assassination excessively intensified the existing traditional religion-based ethnic hostilities in Bosnia. However, in Sarajevo itself, Austrian authorities encouraged violence against the Serb residents, which resulted in the Anti-Serb riots of Sarajevo, in which Catholic Croats and Bosnian Muslims killed two and damaged numerous Serb-owned buildings. Writer Ivo Andrić referred to the violence as the "Sarajevo frenzy of hate." Violent actions against ethnic Serbs were organized not only in Sarajevo but also in many other larger Austro-Hungarian cities in modern-day Croatia and Bosnia and Herzegovina. Austro-Hungarian authorities in Bosnia and Herzegovina imprisoned and extradited approximately 5,500 prominent Serbs, 700 to 2,200 of whom died in prison. 460 Serbs were sentenced to death and a predominantly Muslim special militia known as the Schutzkorps was established and carried out the persecution of Serbs.

Decision for war

While the empire's military spending had not even doubled since the 1878 Congress of Berlin, Germany's spending had risen five-fold, and the British, Russian, and French expenditures threefold. The empire had lost ethnic Italian areas to Piedmont because of nationalist movements that had swept through Italy, and many Austro-Hungarians perceived as imminent the threat of losing to Serbia the southern territories inhabited by Slavs. Serbia had recently gained considerable territory in the Second Balkan War of 1913, causing much distress in government circles in Vienna and Budapest. Former ambassador and foreign minister Count Alois Aehrenthal had assumed that any future war would be in the Balkan region.

Hungarian prime minister and political scientist István Tisza opposed the expansion of the monarchy in the Balkans (see Bosnian crisis in 1908) because "the Dual Monarchy already had too many Slavs", which would further threaten the integrity of the Dual Monarchy. In March 1914, Tisza wrote a memorandum to Emperor Franz Joseph with a strongly apocalyptic, predictive and embittered tone. He used the hitherto unknown word "Weltkrieg" (meaning World War). "It is my firm conviction that Germany's two neighbors [Russia and France] are carefully proceeding with military preparations, but will not start the war so long as they have not attained a grouping of the Balkan states against us that confronts the monarchy with an attack from three sides and pins down the majority of our forces on our eastern and southern front."

On the day of the assassination of Archduke Franz Ferdinand, Tisza immediately traveled to Vienna where he met Minister of Foreign Affairs Count Leopold Berchtold and Army Commander Count Franz Conrad von Hötzendorf. They proposed to solve the dispute with arms, attacking Serbia. Tisza proposed to give the government of Serbia time to take a stand as to whether it was involved in the organisation of the murder and proposed a peaceful resolution, arguing that the international situation would settle soon. Returning to Budapest, he wrote to Emperor Franz Joseph saying he would not take any responsibility for the armed conflict because there was no proof that Serbia had plotted the assassination. Tisza opposed a war with Serbia, stating (correctly, as it turned out) that any war with the Serbs was bound to trigger a war with Russia and hence a general European war. He did not trust in the Italian alliance, due to the political aftermath of the Second Italian War of Independence. He thought that even a successful Austro-Hungarian war would be disastrous for the integrity of Kingdom of Hungary, where Hungary would be the next victim of Austrian politics. After a successful war against Serbia, Tisza foresaw a possible Austrian military attack against the Kingdom of Hungary, where the Austrians want to break up the territory of Hungary.

Some members of the government, such as Count Franz Conrad von Hötzendorf, had wanted to confront the resurgent Serbian nation for some years in a preventive war, but the Emperor, 84 years old and an enemy of all adventures, disapproved.

The foreign ministry of Austro-Hungarian Empire sent ambassador László Szőgyény to Potsdam, where he inquired about the standpoint of the German Emperor on 5 July.
Szőgyény described what happened in a secret report to Vienna later that day:

But now the leaders of Austria–Hungary, especially General Count Leopold von Berchtold, backed by its ally Germany, decided to confront Serbia militarily before it could incite a revolt; using the assassination as an excuse, they presented a list of ten demands called the July Ultimatum, expecting Serbia would never accept. When Serbia accepted nine of the ten demands but only partially accepted the remaining one, Austria–Hungary declared war. Franz Joseph I finally followed the urgent counsel of his top advisers.

Over the course of July and August 1914, these events caused the start of World War I, as Russia mobilized in support of Serbia, setting off a series of counter-mobilizations. In support of his German ally, on Thursday, 6 August 1914, Emperor Franz Joseph signed the declaration of war on Russia. Italy initially remained neutral, although it had an alliance with Austria–Hungary. In 1915, it switched to the side of the Entente powers, hoping to gain territory from its former ally.

Wartime foreign policy

The Austro-Hungarian Empire played a relatively passive diplomatic role in the war, as it was increasingly dominated and controlled by Germany. The only goal was to punish Serbia and try to stop the ethnic breakup of the Empire, and it completely failed. Starting in late 1916 the new Emperor Karl removed the pro-German officials and opened peace overtures to the Allies, whereby the entire war could be ended by compromise, or perhaps Austria would make a separate peace from Germany. The main effort was vetoed by Italy, which had been promised large slices of Austria for joining the Allies in 1915. Austria was only willing to turn over the Trentino region but nothing more. Karl was seen as a defeatist, which weakened his standing at home and with both the Allies and Germany.

Theaters of operations

The Austro-Hungarian Empire conscripted 7.8 million soldiers during WWI.
General von Hötzendorf was the Chief of the Austro-Hungarian General Staff. Franz Joseph I, who was much too old to command the army, appointed Archduke Friedrich von Österreich-Teschen as Supreme Army Commander (Armeeoberkommandant), but asked him to give Von Hötzendorf freedom to take any decisions. Von Hötzendorf remained in effective command of the military forces until Emperor Karl I took the supreme command himself in late 1916 and dismissed Conrad von Hötzendorf in 1917. Meanwhile, economic conditions on the homefront deteriorated rapidly. The Empire depended on agriculture, and agriculture depended on the heavy labor of millions of men who were now in the Army. Food production fell, the transportation system became overcrowded, and industrial production could not successfully handle the overwhelming need for munitions. Germany provided a great deal of help, but it was not enough. Furthermore, the political instability of the multiple ethnic groups of Empire now ripped apart any hope for national consensus in support of the war. Increasingly there was a demand for breaking up the Empire and setting up autonomous national states based on historic language-based cultures. The new Emperor sought peace terms from the Allies, but his initiatives were vetoed by Italy.

Homefront

The heavily rural Empire did have a small industrial base, but its major contribution was manpower and food. Nevertheless, Austria–Hungary was more urbanized (25%) than its actual opponents in the First World War, like the Russian Empire (13.4%), Serbia (13.2%) or Romania (18.8%). Furthermore, the Austro-Hungarian Empire had also more industrialized economy and higher GDP per capita than the Kingdom of Italy, which was economically the far most developed actual opponent of the Empire.

On the home front, food grew scarcer and scarcer, as did heating fuel. Hungary, with its heavy agricultural base, was somewhat better fed. The Army conquered productive agricultural areas in Romania and elsewhere, but refused to allow food shipments to civilians back home. Morale fell every year, and the diverse nationalities gave up on the Empire and looked for ways to establish their own nation states.

Inflation soared, from an index of 129 in 1914 to 1589 in 1918, wiping out the cash savings of the middle-class. In terms of war damage to the economy, the war used up about 20 percent of the GDP. The dead soldiers amounted to about four percent of the 1914 labor force, and the wounded ones to another six percent. Compared all the major countries in the war, the death and casualty rate was toward the high-end regarding the present-day territory of Austria.

By summer 1918, "Green Cadres" of army deserters formed armed bands in the hills of Croatia-Slavonia and civil authority disintegrated. By late October violence and massive looting erupted and there were efforts to form peasant republics. However, the Croatian political leadership was focused on creating a new state (Yugoslavia) and worked with the advancing Serbian army to impose control and end the uprisings.

Serbian front 1914–1916

At the start of the war, the army was divided into two: the smaller part attacked Serbia while the larger part fought against the formidable Imperial Russian Army. The invasion of Serbia in 1914 was a disaster: by the end of the year, the Austro-Hungarian Army had taken no territory, but had lost 227,000 out of a total force of 450,000 men. However, in the autumn of 1915, the Serbian Army was defeated by the Central Powers, which led to the occupation of Serbia. Near the end of 1915, in a massive rescue operation involving more than 1,000 trips made by Italian, French and British steamers, 260,000 Serb surviving soldiers were transported to Brindisi and Corfu, where they waited for the chance of the victory of Allied Powers to reclaim their country. Corfu hosted the Serbian government in exile after the collapse of Serbia and served as a supply base to the Greek front. In April 1916 a large number of Serbian troops were transported in British and French naval vessels from Corfu to mainland Greece. The contingent numbering over 120,000 relieved a much smaller army at the Macedonian front and fought alongside British and French troops.

Russian front 1914–1917

On the Eastern front, the war started out equally poorly. The government accepted the Polish proposal of establishing the Supreme National Committee as the Polish central authority within the Empire, responsible for the formation of the Polish Legions, an auxiliary military formation within the Austro-Hungarian army. The Austro-Hungarian Army was defeated at the Battle of Lemberg and the great fortress city of Przemyśl was besieged and fell in March 1915. The Russian Third Army perished. In summer 1915, the Austro-Hungarian Army, under a unified command with the Germans, participated in the successful Gorlice–Tarnów Offensive. From June 1916, the Russians focused their attacks on the Austro-Hungarian army in the Brusilov Offensive, recognizing the numerical inferiority of the Austro-Hungarian army. By the end of September 1916, Austria–Hungary mobilized and concentrated new divisions, and the successful Russian advance was halted and slowly repelled; but the Austrian armies took heavy losses (about 1 million men) and never recovered. Nevertheless, the huge losses in men and material inflicted on the Russians during the offensive contributed greatly to the revolutions of 1917, and it caused an economic crash in the Russian Empire.

The Act of 5 November 1916 was proclaimed then to the Poles jointly by the Emperors Wilhelm II of Germany and Franz Joseph of Austria-Hungary. This act promised the creation of the Kingdom of Poland out of territory of Congress Poland, envisioned by its authors as a puppet state controlled by the Central Powers, with the nominal authority vested in the Regency Council. The origin of that document was the dire need to draft new recruits from German-occupied Poland for the war with Russia. Following the Armistice of 11 November 1918 ending the World War I, in spite of the previous initial total dependence of the kingdom on its sponsors, it ultimately served against their intentions as the cornerstone proto state of the nascent Second Polish Republic, the latter composed also of territories never intended by the Central Powers to be ceded to Poland.

The Battle of Zborov (1917) was the first significant action of the Czechoslovak Legions, who fought for the independence of Czechoslovakia against the Austro-Hungarian army.

Italian front 1915–1918

In May 1915, Italy attacked Austria–Hungary. Italy was the only military opponent of Austria–Hungary which had a similar degree of industrialization and economic level; moreover, her army was numerous (≈1,000,000 men were immediately fielded), but suffered from poor leadership, training and organization. Chief of Staff Luigi Cadorna marched his army towards the Isonzo river, hoping to seize Ljubljana, and to eventually threaten Vienna. However, the Royal Italian Army were halted on the river, where four battles took place over five months (23 June – 2 December 1915). The fight was extremely bloody and exhausting for both the contenders.

On 15 May 1916, the Austrian Chief of Staff Conrad von Hötzendorf launched the Strafexpedition ("punitive expedition"): the Austrians broke through the opposing front and occupied the Asiago plateau. The Italians managed to resist and in a counteroffensive seized Gorizia on 9 August. Nonetheless, they had to stop on the Carso, a few kilometres away from the border. At this point, several months of indecisive trench warfare ensued (analogous to the Western front). As the Russian Empire collapsed as a result of the Bolshevik Revolution and Russians ended their involvement in the war, Germans and Austrians were able to move on the Western and Southern fronts much manpower from the erstwhile Eastern fighting.

Italy, although suffering massive casualties, recovered from the blow, and a coalition government under Vittorio Emanuele Orlando was formed. Italy also enjoyed support by the Entente powers: by 1918, large amounts of war materials and a few auxiliary American, British, and French divisions arrived in the Italian battle zone. Cadorna was replaced by General Armando Diaz; under his command, the Italians retook the initiative and won the decisive Battle of the Piave river (15–23 June 1918), in which some 60,000 Austrian and 43,000 Italian soldiers were killed. The final battle was at Vittorio Veneto; after 4 days of stiff resistance, Italian troops crossed the Piave River, and after losing 90,000 men the defeated Austrian troops retreated in disarray pursued by the Italians. The Italians captured 448,000 Austrian-Hungarian soldiers (about one-third of the imperial-royal army), 24 of whom were generals, 5,600 cannons and mortars, and 4,000 machine guns. The armistice was signed at Villa Giusti on 3 November, in spite of Austria–Hungary already having disintegrated on 31 October 1918.

Romanian front 1916–1917

On 27 August 1916, Romania declared war against Austria–Hungary. The Romanian Army crossed the borders of Eastern Hungary (Transylvania), and despite initial successes, by November 1916, the Central Powers formed by the Austro-Hungarian, German, Bulgarian, and Ottoman armies, had defeated the Romanian and Russian armies of the Entente Powers, and occupied the southern part of Romania (including Oltenia, Muntenia and Dobruja). Within 3 months of the war, the Central Powers came near Bucharest, the Romanian capital city. On 6 December, the Central Powers captured Bucharest, and part of the population moved to the unoccupied Romanian territory, in Moldavia, together with the Romanian government, royal court and public authorities, which relocated to Iași.

In 1917, after several defensive victories (managing to stop the German-Austro-Hungarian advance), with Russia's withdrawal from the war following the October Revolution, Romania was forced to drop out of the war.

Whereas the German army realized it needed close cooperation from the homefront, Habsburg officers saw themselves as entirely separate from the civilian world, and superior to it. When they occupied productive areas, such as southern Romania, they seized food stocks and other supplies for their own purposes and blocked any shipments intended for civilians back in the Austro-Hungarian Empire. The result was that the officers lived well, as the civilians began to starve. Vienna even transferred training units to Serbia and Poland for the sole purpose of feeding them. In all, the Army obtained about 15 percent of its cereal needs from occupied territories.

Role of Hungary

Although the Kingdom of Hungary comprised only 42% of the population of Austria–Hungary, the thin majority – more than 3.8 million soldiers – of the Austro-Hungarian armed forces were conscripted from the Kingdom of Hungary during the First World War. Roughly 600,000 soldiers were killed in action, and 700,000 soldiers were wounded in the war.

Austria–Hungary held on for years, as the Hungarian half provided sufficient supplies for the military to continue to wage war. This was shown in a transition of power after which the Hungarian prime minister, Count István Tisza, and foreign minister, Count István Burián, had decisive influence over the internal and external affairs of the monarchy. By late 1916, food supply from Hungary became intermittent and the government sought an armistice with the Entente powers. However, this failed as Britain and France no longer had any regard for the integrity of the monarchy because of Austro-Hungarian support for Germany.

Analysis of defeat
The setbacks that the Austrian army suffered in 1914 and 1915 can be attributed to a large extent by the incompetence of the Austrian high command. After attacking Serbia, its forces soon had to be withdrawn to protect its eastern frontier against Russia's invasion, while German units were engaged in fighting on the Western Front. This resulted in a greater than expected loss of men in the invasion of Serbia. Furthermore, it became evident that the Austrian high command had had no plans for possible continental war and that the army and navy were also ill-equipped to handle such a conflict.

In the last two years of the war the Austro-Hungarian armed forces lost all ability to act independently of Germany. As of 7 September 1916, the German emperor was given full control of all the armed forces of the Central Powers and Austria-Hungary effectively became a satellite of Germany.  The Austrians viewed the German army favorably, on the other hand by 1916 the general belief in Germany was that Germany, in its alliance with Austria–Hungary, was "shackled to a corpse". The operational capability of the Austro-Hungarian army was seriously affected by supply shortages, low morale and a high casualty rate, and by the army's composition of multiple ethnicities with different languages and customs.

The last two successes for the Austrians, the Romanian Offensive and the Caporetto Offensive, were German-assisted operations. As the Dual Monarchy became more politically unstable, it became more and more dependent on German assistance. The majority of its people, other than Hungarians and German Austrians, became increasingly restless.

In 1917, the Eastern front of the Entente Powers completely collapsed. In spite of this, the Austro-Hungarian Empire then withdrew from all defeated countries due to its dire economic condition, as well as signs of impeding disintegration.

Demise, disintegration, dissolution and legacy

Demise
By 1918, the economic situation had deteriorated.  The government had failed badly on the homefront. Historian Alexander Watson reports:
 As the Imperial economy collapsed into severe hardship and even starvation, its multi-ethnic army lost its morale and was increasingly hard-pressed to hold its line. At the last Italian offensive, the Austro-Hungarian Army took to the field without any food and munition supply and fought without any political supports for a de facto non-existent empire.

The Austro-Hungarian monarchy collapsed with dramatic speed in the autumn of 1918. Leftist and pacifist political movements organized strikes in factories, and uprisings in the army had become commonplace.  These leftist or left-liberal pro-Entente maverick parties opposed the monarchy as a form of government and considered themselves internationalist rather than patriotic. Eventually, the German defeat and the minor revolutions in Vienna and Budapest gave political power to the left/liberal political parties.

Disintegration
As the war went on, the ethnic unity declined; the Allies encouraged breakaway demands from minorities and the Empire faced disintegration. As it became apparent that the Allied powers would win World War I, nationalist movements, which had previously been calling for a greater degree of autonomy for various areas, started pressing for full independence. In the capital cities of Vienna and Budapest, the leftist and liberal movements and opposition parties strengthened and supported the separatism of ethnic minorities. The multiethnic Austro-Hungarian Empire started to disintegrate, leaving its army alone on the battlefields. The military breakdown of the Italian front marked the start of the rebellion for the numerous ethnicities who made up the multiethnic Empire, as they refused to keep on fighting for a cause that now appeared senseless. The Emperor had lost much of his power to rule, as his realm disintegrated.

As one of his Fourteen Points, President Woodrow Wilson demanded that the nationalities of Austria–Hungary have the "freest opportunity to autonomous development". In response, Emperor Karl I agreed to reconvene the Imperial Parliament in 1917 and allow the creation of a confederation with each national group exercising self-governance. However, the leaders of these national groups rejected the idea; they deeply distrusted Vienna and were now determined to get independence.

On 14 October 1918, Foreign Minister Baron István Burián von Rajecz asked for an armistice based on the Fourteen Points. In an apparent attempt to demonstrate good faith, Emperor Karl issued a proclamation ("Imperial Manifesto of 16 October 1918") two days later which would have significantly altered the structure of the Austrian half of the monarchy. The Polish majority regions of Lesser Poland and part of Galicia were to be granted the option of seceding from the empire to join the earlier established Polish proto-state, in order to reunite with their ethnic brethren in the Polish lands held by Russia and Germany, with the ultimate goal of resurrecting the sovereign Polish statehood. In fact, the Regency Council in Warsaw already adopted on 6 October Wilson's proposals as the basis for creating a Polish state. However, the imperial government attempted to curb the Polish ambitions by inciting the Polish-Ukrainian conflict through separating and retaining the remainder of Galicia and the entire Lodomeria, designated in the secret Treaty of Brest-Litovsk (Ukraine–Central Powers) for the purpose of creating a Ukrainian polity, intended in the proclamation to constitute along the rest of Cisleithania a transformed federal union composed of four parts—German, Czech, South Slav and Ukrainian. Each of these was to be governed by a national council that would negotiate the future of the empire with Vienna. Trieste was to receive a special status. No such proclamation could be issued in Hungary, where Hungarian aristocrats still believed they could subdue other nationalities and maintain the "Holy Kingdom of St. Stephen".

It was a dead letter. Four days later, on 18 October, United States Secretary of State Robert Lansing replied that the Allies were now committed to the causes of the Czechs, Slovaks and South Slavs. Therefore, Lansing said, autonomy for the nationalities – the tenth of the Fourteen Points – was no longer enough and Washington could not deal on the basis of the Fourteen Points anymore. In fact, a Czechoslovak provisional government had joined the Allies on 14 October. The South Slavs in both halves of the monarchy had already declared in favor of uniting with Serbia in a large South Slav state by way of the 1917 Corfu Declaration signed by members of the Yugoslav Committee. Indeed, the Croatians had begun disregarding orders from Budapest earlier in October. The Lansing note was, in effect, the death certificate of Austria–Hungary.

The national councils had already begun acting more or less as provisional governments of independent countries. During the Italian battles, the Czechoslovaks and Southern Slavs declared their independence. With defeat in the war imminent after the Italian offensive in the Battle of Vittorio Veneto on 24 October, Czech politicians peacefully took over command in Prague on 28 October (later declared the birthday of Czechoslovakia) and followed up in other major cities in the next few days. On 30 October, the Slovaks followed i Martin. On 29 October, the Slavs in both portions of what remained of Austria–Hungary proclaimed the State of Slovenes, Croats and Serbs. They also declared that their ultimate intention was to unite with Serbia and Montenegro in a large South Slav state. On the same day, the Czechs and Slovaks formally proclaimed the establishment of Czechoslovakia as an independent state.

Dissolution
Alexander Watson argues that, "The Habsburg regime's doom was sealed when Wilson's response to the note, sent two and a half weeks earlier [by the foreign minister Baron István Burián von Rajecz on 14 October 1918 ], arrived on 20 October." Wilson rejected the continuation of the dual monarchy as a negotiable possibility.

On 17 October 1918, the Hungarian Parliament voted in favour of terminating the union with Austria. The most prominent opponent of continued union with Austria, Count Mihály Károlyi, seized power in the Aster Revolution on 31 October. Charles was all but forced to appoint Károlyi as his Hungarian prime minister. One of Károlyi's first acts was to repudiate the compromise agreement on 31 October, effectively terminating the personal union with Austria and thus officially dissolving the Austro-Hungarian Monarchy state.

By the end of October, there was nothing left of the Habsburg realm but its majority-German Danubian and Alpine provinces, and Karl's authority was being challenged even there by the German-Austrian state council. Karl's last Austrian prime minister, Heinrich Lammasch, concluded that Karl's position was untenable. Lammasch persuaded Karl that the best course was to relinquish, at least temporarily, his right to exercise sovereign authority.

On 11 November, Karl issued a carefully worded proclamation in which he recognized the Austrian people's right to determine the form of the state and "relinquish(ed) every participation" in Austrian state affairs. He also dismissed Lammasch and his government from office and released the officials in the Austrian half of the empire from their oath of loyalty to him. Two days later, he issued a similar proclamation for Hungary.

Although this action has sometimes been construed as an abdication, Charles deliberately avoided using the term. He intended to remain available in the event the people of either state should recall him. Nevertheless, for all intents and purposes, this was the end of the Habsburg monarchy.

Since my ascent to the throne, I have been constantly trying to lead my people out of the horrors of war, which I am not responsible for.

I have not hesitated to restore constitutional life and have opened the way for peoples to develop their own state independently.

Still filled with unchangeable love for all My peoples, I do not want to oppose the free development of My Person as an obstacle.

I recognize in advance the decision that German Austria will make regarding its future form of government.

The people took over the government through their representatives. I waive any share in state affairs.

At the same time, I am releasing My Austrian Government from office.

May the people of German Austria create and consolidate the reorganization in harmony and forgiveness. The happiness of my peoples has been the goal of my most fervent wishes from the beginning.

Only inner peace can heal the wounds of this war.

Seit meiner thronbesteigung war ich unablässig bemüht, Meine Volker aus den Schrecknissen des Krieges herauszuführen, an dessen Ausbruch ich keinerlei Schuld trage.

Ich habe nicht gezögert, das verfassungsmaßige Leben wieder herzustellen und haben den Völkern den Weg zu ihrer selbständingen staatlichen Entwicklung eröffnet.

Nach wie vor von unwandelbarer Liebe für alle Meine Völker erfüllt, will ich ihrer freien Entfaltung Meine Person nicht als Hindernis entgegenstellen.

Im voraus erkenne ich die Entscheidung an, die Deutschösterreich über seine künftige Staatsform trifft.

Das Volk hat durch seine Vertreter die Regierung übernommen. Ich verzichte auf jeden Anteil an den Staatsgeschäften.

Gleichzeitig enthebe ich Meine österreichische Regierung ihres Amtes.

Möge das Volk von Deutschösterreich in Eintracht und Versöhnlichkeit die Neuordnung schaffen und befestigen. Das Glück Meiner Völker war von Anbeginn das Ziel Meiner heißesten Wünsche.

Nur der innere Friede kann die Wunden dieses Krieges heilen.

Karl's refusal to abdicate was ultimately irrelevant. On the day after he announced his withdrawal from Austria's politics, the German-Austrian National Council proclaimed the Republic of German Austria. Károlyi followed suit on 16 November, proclaiming the Hungarian Democratic Republic.

Successor states

There were two legal successor states of the former Austro–Hungarian monarchy:
 German Austria (which became the First Austrian Republic)
 Hungarian Democratic Republic (which after a few other short-lived intermediaries became the Kingdom of Hungary)

The Treaty of Saint-Germain-en-Laye (between the victors of World War I and Austria) and the Treaty of Trianon (between the victors and Hungary) regulated the new borders of Austria and Hungary, reducing them to small-sized and landlocked states. In regard to areas without a decisive national majority, the Entente powers ruled in many cases in favour of the newly emancipated independent nation-states, enabling them to claim vast territories containing sizeable German- and Hungarian-speaking populations.

The decisions contained in the treaties had immense political and economic effects. The previously rapid economic growth of the imperial territories initially stalled because the new borders became major economic barriers. Many established industries and infrastructure elements were intended to satisfy the needs of an extensive realm. As a result, the emerging countries were often compelled to considerable sacrifices in order to transform their economies. A major political unease in the affected regions followed as a result of these economic difficulties, fueling in some cases extremist movements.

Austria
As a result, the Republic of Austria lost roughly 60% of the old Austrian Empire's territory. It also had to drop its plans for union with Germany, as it was not allowed to unite with Germany without League approval.

The new Austrian state was, at least on paper, on shakier ground than Hungary. Unlike its former Hungarian partner, Austria had never been a nation in any real sense. While the Austrian state had existed in one form or another for 700 years, it was united only by loyalty to the Habsburgs. With the loss of 60% of the Austrian Empire's prewar territory, Vienna was now a lavish and oversized imperial capital lacking an empire to support it, thus being sarcastically referred to as the "national hydrocephalus".

However, after a brief period of upheaval and the Allies' foreclosure of union with Germany, Austria established itself as a federal republic. Despite the temporary Anschluss with Nazi Germany, it still survives today. Adolf Hitler cited that all "Germans" – such as him and the others from Austria, etc. – should be united with Germany.

Hungary
By comparison, Hungary had been a nation and a state for over 900 years. Hungary, however, was severely disrupted by the loss of 72% of its territory, 64% of its population and most of its natural resources. The Hungarian Democratic Republic was short-lived and was temporarily replaced by the communist Hungarian Soviet Republic. Romanian troops ousted Béla Kun and his communist government during the Hungarian–Romanian War of 1919.

In the summer of 1919, a Habsburg, Archduke Joseph August, became regent, but was forced to stand down after only two weeks when it became apparent the Allies would not recognise him. Finally, in March 1920, royal powers were entrusted to a regent, Miklós Horthy, who had been the last commanding admiral of the Austro-Hungarian Navy and had helped organize the counter-revolutionary forces. It was this government that signed the Treaty of Trianon under protest on 4 June 1920 at the Grand Trianon Palace in Versailles, France. The restored Kingdom of Hungary lost roughly 72% of the pre-war territory of the Kingdom of Hungary.

Habsburg banishment
Austria had passed the "Habsburg Law," which both dethroned the Habsburgs and banished all Habsburgs from Austrian territory. While Karl was banned from ever returning to Austria again, other Habsburgs could return if they gave up all claims to the defunct throne.

In March and again in October 1921, ill-prepared attempts by Karl to regain the throne in Budapest collapsed. The initially wavering Horthy, after receiving threats of intervention from the Allied Powers and the Little Entente, refused his cooperation. Soon afterward, the Hungarian government nullified the Pragmatic Sanction, effectively dethroning the Habsburgs. Subsequently, the British took custody of Karl and removed him and his family to the Portuguese island of Madeira, where he died the following year.

Territorial legacy

Immediately after World War I
The following states were formed, re-established or expanded at the dissolution of the former Austro–Hungarian monarchy:
 German Austria (which became the First Austrian Republic)
 First Hungarian Republic which became the Hungarian Soviet Republic, subsequently briefly restored and replaced by the Hungarian Republic, ultimately transformed into the Kingdom of Hungary
 First Czechoslovak Republic ("Czechoslovakia" from 1920 to 1938)
 Second Polish Republic, contested by the short-lived proto-states of Tarnobrzeg Republic and Polish Soviet Socialist Republic
 State of Slovenes, Croats and Serbs and the Kingdom of Serbia, both later absorbed into the Kingdom of Serbs, Croats and Slovenes
 Greater Romania
 Kingdom of Italy
 Republic of China (former Austro-Hungarian concession of Tianjin)
 the short-lived Ruthenian (Ukrainian and Rusyn) proto-states of West Ukrainian People's Republic (later absorbed into Ukrainian People's Republic), Hutsul Republic, Lemko Republic, Komancza Republic and the Galician Soviet Socialist Republic; all were ultimately absorbed mostly into Poland, but also into Hungary, Czechoslovakia, Romania and Yugoslavia.

The Principality of Liechtenstein, which had formerly looked to Vienna for protection and whose ruling house held sizable real estate in Cisleithania, formed a customs and defense union with Switzerland, and adopted the Swiss currency instead of the Austrian. In April 1919, Vorarlberg – the westernmost province of Austria – voted by a large majority to join Switzerland; however, both the Swiss and the Allies disregarded this result.

Present
The following present-day countries and parts of countries were within the boundaries of Austria–Hungary when the empire was dissolved. Some other provinces of Europe had been part of the Habsburg monarchy at one time before 1867.

Empire of Austria (Cisleithania):
 Austria (except Burgenland without Sopron)
 Czech Republic (except the Hlučínsko area)
 Slovenia (except Prekmurje)
 Italy (Trentino, South Tyrol, parts of the province of Belluno and small portions of Friuli-Venezia Giulia)
 Croatia (Dalmatia, Istria)
 Poland (voivodeships of Lesser Poland, Subcarpathia, southernmost part of Silesia (Bielsko and Cieszyn))
 Ukraine (oblasts of Lviv, Ivano-Frankivsk, Ternopil (except its northern corner) and most of the oblast of Chernivtsi)
 Romania (county of Suceava)
 Montenegro (bay of Boka Kotorska, the coast and the immediate hinterland around the cities of Budva, Petrovac and Sutomore)

Kingdom of Hungary (Transleithania):
 Hungary
 Slovakia
 Austria (Burgenland except Sopron)
 Slovenia (Prekmurje)
 Croatia (Croatian Baranja and Međimurje county, Fiume as corpus separatum along with Slavonia and Central Croatia were not part of Hungary proper, the latter two were part of the sovereign Kingdom of Croatia-Slavonia)
 Ukraine (oblast of Zakarpattia)
 Romania (region of Transylvania, Partium and parts of Banat, Crișana, and Maramureș)
 Serbia (autonomous province of Vojvodina and northern Belgrade region)
 Poland (Polish parts of Orava and Spiš)

Austro-Hungarian Condominium
 Bosnia and Herzegovina (the villages of Zavalje, Mali Skočaj and Veliki Skočaj including the immediate surrounding area west of the city of Bihać)
 Montenegro (Sutorina – western part of the Municipality of Herceg Novi between present borders with Croatia (SW) and Bosnia and Herzegovina (NW), Adriatic coast (E) and the township of Igalo (NE))
 Sandžak-Raška region, Austro-Hungarian occupied 1878 until withdrawal in 1908 whilst formally part of the Ottoman Empire
 The Empire treated Bosnia-Herzegovina in much the same way the other powers treated their overseas colonies

Other possessions of the Austro-Hungarian Monarchy
 People's Republic of China (former Austro-Hungarian concession of Tianjin)

See also
 Aftermath of World War I
 Austrian nobility
 Corporative federalism, a form of administration adopted by the Austro-Hungarian Empire
 Diplomatic history of World War I
 Austro-Hungarian entry into World War I
 Ethnic composition of Austria–Hungary
 Former countries in Europe after 1815
 Hungarian nobility
 Lands of the Bohemian Crown (1867–1918)
 United States of Greater Austria

Notes

References

Bibliography

Further reading

 Armour, Ian D. "Apple of Discord: Austria-Hungary, Serbia and the Bosnian Question 1867-71." Slavonic and East European Review 87#4 2009, pp. 629–680. online
 Bagger, Eugene S, Francis Joseph : emperor of Austria--king of Hungary (1927) online
 Bridge, F.R. From Sadowa to Sarajevo: the foreign policy of Austria-Hungary, 1866-1914 (1972) online
  online
 Cornwall, Mark, ed. The Last Years of Austria–Hungary: Essays in political and military history, 1908-1918 (U of Exeter Press, 2002). online 
 Encyclopædia Britannica (12th ed. 1922) comprises the 11th edition plus three new volumes (30–32) that cover events since 1911 with very thorough coverage of World War I as well as every country and colony (partly online).
 
 Evans, R. J. W. Austria, Hungary, and the Habsburgs (2008) 
 Fichtner, Paula Sutter. Historical Dictionary of Austria (2nd ed 2009)
 Good, David. The Economic Rise of the Habsburg Empire (1984) excerpt
 Herman, Arthur. What Life Was Like: At Empire's End : Austro-Hungarian Empire 1848–1918 (Time Life, 2000); heavily illustrated
 Jelavich, Barbara. Modern Austria: empire and republic, 1815-1986 (Cambridge UP, 1987, pp 72–150.
  pp 264–436.
 Johnston., William M. The Austrian Mind: An Intellectual and Social History, 1848-1938 (U of California Press, 1972) 515 pp.
 ; highly detailed history; emphasis on ethnicity
 Macartney, Carlile Aylmer The Habsburg Empire, 1790–1918, New York, Macmillan 1969.
 Mason, John W. The dissolution of the Austro-Hungarian empire, 1867-1918 (Routledge, 2014).
 May, Arthur J. The Hapsburg Monarchy 1867–1914 (Harvard UP, 1951). online
 Milward, Alan, and S. B. Saul. The Development of the Economies of Continental Europe 1850-1914 (1977) pp 271–331. online
 
 Oakes, Elizabeth and Eric Roman. Austria–Hungary and the Successor States: A Reference Guide from the Renaissance to the Present (2003)
 Palmer, Alan. Twilight of the Habsburgs: The Life and Times of Emperor Francis Joseph. New York: Weidenfeld & Nicolson, 1995. 
 Redlich, Joseph. Emperor Francis Joseph Of Austria. New York: Macmillan, 1929. online free
 Roman, Eric. Austria-Hungary & the Successor States: A Reference Guide from the Renaissance to the Present (2003), 699pp online
 Rudolph, Richard L. Banking and industrialization in Austria-Hungary: the role of banks in the industrialization of the Czech crownlands, 1873-1914 (1976) online
 Sauer, Walter. "Habsburg Colonial: Austria-Hungary's Role in European Overseas Expansion Reconsidered," Austrian Studies (2012) 20:5-23 ONLINE
 
 
 Sugar, Peter F. et al. eds. A History of Hungary (1990), pp 252–294. 
 ; politics and diplomacy
 Tschuppik, Karl. The reign of the Emperor Fransis Joseph (1930) online
 Turnock, David. Eastern Europe: An Historical Geography: 1815-1945 (1989) 
 Usher, Roland G. "Austro-German Relations Since 1866." American Historical Review 23.3 (1918): 577-595 online.
 Várdy, Steven, and Agnes Várdy. The Austro-Hungarian mind: at home and abroad (East European Monographs, 1989)
 Vermes, Gabor. "The Impact of the Dual Alliance on the Magyars of the Austro-Hungarian Monarchy" East Central Europe (1980) vol 7 DOI: 10.1163/187633080x00211

World war

 Bassett, Richard. For God and Kaiser: The Imperial Austrian Army, 1619-1918 (2016) excerpt
 
 
 
 
 Crankshaw, Edward. The Fall of the House of Habsburg (Viking, 1963). Pp. 449. 
 Deak, John, and Jonathan E. Gumz. "How to Break a State: The Habsburg Monarchy's Internal War, 1914–1918" American Historical Review 122.4 (2017): 1105–1136. online
 
 Grátz, Gusztáv. he economic policy of Austria-Hungary during the war in its external relations (Yale UP, 1928) online
 
 
  online
 
 
 
 
 Kronenbitter, Günther. "Pre-war Military Planning (Austria–Hungary)." online
 
 Sked, Alan. "Austria–Hungary and the First World War." Histoire@ Politique 1 (2014): 16–49. Online
 
 Tunstall, Graydon A. Austro-Hungarian Army and the First World War (Cambridge UP 2021) online review
 Vermes, Gabor István Tisza: The Liberal Vision and Conservative Statecraft of a Magyar Nationalist (Columbia University Press, 1986); online review
 Wank, Solomon. In the Twilight of Empire. Count Alois Lexa von Aehrenthal (1854–1912): Imperial Habsburg Patriot and Statesman. Vol. 2: From Foreign Minister in Waiting to de facto Chancellor (Vandenhoeck & Ruprecht, 2020).

Primary sources

 Austro-Hungarian Monarchy.  Austro-Hungarian red book. (1915) English translations of official documents to justify the war. online
 
 Gooch, G. P. Recent Revelations of European Diplomacy (1940), pp 103–59 summarizes memoirs of major participants
 Steed, Henry Wickham. The Hapsburg monarchy (1919) online detailed contemporary account

Historiography and memory

 Boyd, Kelly, ed. Encyclopedia of Historians and Historical Writers (Rutledge, 1999) 1:60–63, historiography
 
 Körner, Axel. "Beyond Nation States: New Perspectives on the Habsburg Empire." European History Quarterly 48.3 (2018): 516–533. online
 
 
 Sked, Alan. "Explaining the Habsburg Empire, 1830–90." in Pamela Pilbeam, ed., Themes in Modern European History 1830–1890 (Routledge, 2002) pp. 141–176.
 Sked, Alan. "Austria–Hungary and the First World War." Histoire Politique 1 (2014): 16–49. online free historiography

In German

 . (ed.: Rudolf Rothaug), K. u. k. Hof-Kartographische Anstalt G. Freytag & Berndt, Vienna, 1911.

External links

 Articles relating to Austria–Hungary at the International Encyclopedia of the First World War.
 Habsburg Empire Austrian line
 Microsoft Encarta: The height of the dual monarchy (Archived 31 October 2009)
 The Austro-Hungarian Military
 Heraldry of the Austro-Hungarian Empire
  – extensive list of heads of state, ministers, and ambassadors
 History of Austro-Hungarian currency
 Austria–Hungary, Dual Monarchy
 Map of Europe and the collapse of Austria–Hungary at omniatlas.com
 Mangham, Arthur Neal. The Social Bases of Austrian Politics: The German Electoral Districts of Cisleithania, 1900–1914. Ph.D. thesis 1974
 Austro-Hungarian Land Forces 1848–1918 
 Oldphoto.info – Austro-Hungarian Imperial and Royal Army
 HABSBURG is an email discussion list dealing with the culture and history of the Habsburg monarchy and its successor states in central Europe since 1500, with discussions, syllabi, book reviews, queries, conferences; edited daily by scholars since 1994

 
Former countries in the Balkans
Former empires
Former monarchies of Europe
Habsburg monarchy
House of Habsburg-Lorraine
Modern history of Austria
Modern history of Hungary
 
States and territories established in 1867
1867 establishments in Europe
States and territories disestablished in 1918

1918 disestablishments in Europe
Christian states